= List of The Heroic Legend of Arslan chapters =

The Heroic Legend of Arslan, a manga adaptation of Yoshiki Tanaka's 1986–2017 novel series by Hiromu Arakawa, started in Kodansha's Bessatsu Shōnen Magazine on July 9, 2013. Kodansha has collected its chapters into individual tankōbon volumes. The first volume was released on April 9, 2014. As of October 8, 2026, twenty-five volumes have been released.

In North America, the manga was digitally published in English by Crunchyroll Manga from 2014 until 2018, when the company announced that they would no longer publish manga from Kodansha. Kodansha USA began publishing the manga in print and digital format on August 19, 2014.

== Volumes ==
No.	Original release date	Original ISBN	English release date	English ISBN
1	April 9, 2014	978-4-06-395050-2	August 19, 2014	978-1-61262-972-8
1. "The Splendor of Ecbatana" (エクバターナの栄華, Ekubatāna no eiga); 2. "The Encounter at Atropatene" (アトロパテネの会戦, Atoropatene no kaisen); 3. "The Knight in Black" (黒衣の騎士, Kokui no kishi); 4. "A Reunion with an Old Friend" (旧友との再会, Kyūyū to no saikai)
2	May 9, 2014	978-4-06-395063-2	November 4, 2014 (physical); November 11, 2014 (e-book)	978-1-61262-973-5; 978-1-61262-976-6
5. "A Monarchy's Generosity" (君主の度量, Kunshu no doryō); 6. "One Arrow of Salvation" (救いの一矢, Sukui no isshi); 7. "The Wandering Minstrel" (流浪の楽師, Rurō no gakushi); 8. "The Bloodstained Gates" (血塗れの門, Chimamire no mon); 9. "Bacchanal of Bloodshed" (流血の狂宴, Ryūketsu no kyōen); 10. "The Captive Queen" (囚われの王妃, Toraware no ōhi)
3	February 9, 2015	978-4-06-395307-7	May 12, 2015	978-1-61262-974-2
11. "Kharlan Goes to Battle" (カーラーンの出陣, Kārān no shutsujin); 12. "A Peerless Beauty" (絶世の美女, Zessei no bijo); 13. "The Traitor Hero" (裏切りの英雄, Uragiri no eiyū); 14. "The King's Whereabouts" (王の行方, Ō no yukue); 15. "The Rightful King" (正統の王, Seitō no ō); 16. "The Love of King Innocentis" (イノケンティス王の恋, Inokentisu ō no koi); 17. "Beneath the Mask" (仮面の下, Kamen no shita); 18. "Reunion by the Shore" (水辺の再会, Mizube no saikai); 19. "The Second Prince" (二人目の王子, Futari-me no ōji)
4	October 9, 2015	978-4-06-395508-8	December 29, 2015	978-1-63236-111-0
20. "The Lord of the Fortress at Kashan" (カシャーン城塞の主, Jōsai no shu); 21. "Hodir's Plot" (ホディールの謀, Hodīru no hakarigoto); 22. "For One's Lord" (主のために, Nushi no tame ni); 23. "The Site of Justice" (正義のありか, Seigi no arika); 24. "Hand of the Devil" (魔の手, Ma no te); 25. "The Road to Peshawar" (ペシャワールへの道, Peshawāru e no dō); 26. "Minstrel in the Moonlight" (月下の吟遊詩人, Gekka no gin'yū shijin); 27. "Son of Kharlan" (カーラーンの息子, Kārān no musuko)
5	May 9, 2016; May 3, 2016 (LE)	978-4-06-358794-4; 978-4-06-512047-7 (LE)	August 23, 2016	978-1-63236-218-6
28. "Daughter of the Zot Clan" (ゾット族の娘, Zotto zoku no musume); 29. "A Village at Twilight" (黄昏の村, Tasogare no mura); 30. "Shadow of the Snake King" (蛇王の影, Hebiō no kage); 31. "Behind One's Eyelids" (瞼の奥, Mabuta no oku); 32. "Return of the Warrior" (戦士の帰還, Senshi no kikan); 33. "Sām's Submission" (サームの帰従, Sāmu no kijū); 34. "The Magic Mountain" (魔の山, Ma no yama)
6	November 9, 2016	978-4-06-395793-8; 978-4-06-358830-9 (LE)	February 14, 2017	978-1-63236-307-7
35. "Twin-Blade's Falcon" (双刀の鷹, Sō katana no taka); 36. "The Character of a King" (国王の資質, Kokuō no shishitsu); 37. "Fortress of Sandstone" (砂岩の城, Sagan no shiro); 38. "Two Princess" (二人の王子, Futari no ōji); 39. "Royal Blood" (王家の血, Ōke no chi); 40. "The Three Principles" (三つの理, Mittsu no ri)
7	May 9, 2017	978-4-06-395937-6	October 24, 2017	978-1-63236-351-0
41. "The Sindhuran Rake" (シンドゥラの色男, Shindura no irootoko); 42. "A Foreign Sky" (異国の空, Ikoku no sora); 43. "Ceremony of the New Year" (新年の儀, Shinnen no gi); 44. "The Guide in the Dark Night" (闇夜の案内人, An'ya no annai-nin); 45. "The Battle of Gujarat" (グジャラートの戦い, Gujarāto no tatakai); 46. "The Bond of Servant and Master" (君臣の儀, Kunshin no gi)
8	November 9, 2017	978-4-06-510379-1	April 10, 2018	978-1-63236-484-5
47. "The Day of the Decisive Battle" (決戦の日, Kessen no hi); 48. "The Thundering" (轟音の戦象部隊, Gōon no ikusa zō butai); 49. "King Karikala's Decision" (カリカーラ王の決断, Karikāra ō no ketsudan); 50. "The Beast in the Arena" (決闘場の獣, Kettō-jō no kemono); 51. "The Gods' Judgment" (神々の裁き, Kamigami no sabaki); 52. "The Sun Sets on the Capital" (落日の国都, Rakujitsu no kokuto)
9	May 9, 2018	978-4-06-511399-8; 978-4-06-512057-6 (LE)	October 2, 2018	978-1-63236-680-1
53. "The Last Supper" (最後の晩餐, Saigo no bansan); 54. "Return of the Warrior" (戦士の帰還, Senshi no kikan); 55. "Location of the Secret Letter" (密書の行方, Missho no yukue); 56. "Pool of Blood" (血の澱み, Chi no odomi); 57. "The Chance Encounter in Early Spring" (早春の邂逅, Sōshun no kaikō); 58. "The Unrivaled Traveler" (無双の旅人, Musō no tabibito)
10	November 9, 2018	978-4-06-513236-4; 978-4-06-514131-1 (LE)	April 23, 2019	978-1-63236-730-3
59. "Cornerstone of Subjugation" (討伐の礎, Tōbatsu no ishizue); 60. "Decisive Battle at Zabul Fortress" (ザーブル城の決戦, Zāburu-jō no kessen); 61. "The Messenger from Maryam" (マルヤムの使者, Maru yamu no shisha); 62. "The Queen of a Ruined Kingdom" (亡国の王女, Bōkoku no ōjo); 63. "The Job of a Bandit" (盗賊の仕事, Tōzoku no shigoto); 64. "Shapur's Younger Brother" (シャプールの弟, Shapūru no otōto)
11	May 9, 2019	978-4-06-517309-1; 978-4-06-516225-5 (LE)	October 1, 2019	978-1-63236-856-0
65. "The Wolf's Wrath" (狼の怒り, kami no ikari); 66. "A Poem of Parting" (別れの四行詩, Wakare no yon gyō shi); 67. "Parsian Propriety" (パルス流の礼節, Parusu-ryū no reisetsu); 68. "The Harnāk at Shahristan" (シャフリスターンの狩猟祭, Shafurisutān no shuryō-sai); 69. "The Girl of The Keep of Saint Emmanuel" (聖マヌエル城の少女, Sei Manueru-jō no shōjo); 70. "Moment of Life or Death" (存亡の秋, Sonbō no aki)
12	November 8, 2019	978-4-06-517309-1; 978-4-06-517310-7 (LE)	April 7, 2020	978-1-63236-901-7
71. "Guiscard's Ambition" (ギスカールの野望, Gisukāru no yabō); 72. "The Return of the King" (王の帰還, Ō no kikan); 73. "Hymn of Life" (生命の賛歌, Seimei no sanka); 74. "The Wandering Marzbān" (流浪の万騎長, Rurō no banki-chō); 75. "The Name of the Decoy" (囮の名は, Otori no na wa); 76. "Tūrānian Army's Onslaught" (トゥラーン軍の猛攻, Gun no mōkō)
13	May 8, 2020	978-4-06-518847-7; 978-4-06-519633-5 (LE)	October 27, 2020	978-1-64651-030-6
77. "Jubilation of Peshawar" (歓喜のペシャワール, Kanki no Peshawāru); 78. "Beneath the Tomb" (墓の下, Haka no shita); 79. "Spasms of the Earth" (激震の大地, Gekishin no daichi); 80. "The Snake King Stirs" (蛇王の蠢き, Hebiō no ugomeki); 81. "The Humiliation of Lusitania" (ルシタニアの屈辱, Rushitania no kutsujoku); 82. "Rulers of the Grassland" (草原の覇者, Sōgen no hasha)
14	December 9, 2020	978-4-06-521680-4; 978-4-06-522418-2 (LE)	June 1, 2021	978-1-64651-025-2
83. "The Tūrānian King's Taunt" (トゥラーン国王の挑発, Kokuō no chōhatsu); 84. "Rivals in Love" (恋の鞘当て, Koi no sayaate); 85. "Night Raid of the Venomous Wasp" (毒蜂の夜襲, Doku hachi no yashū); 86. "Tragedy Beneath The New Moon" (新月の惨劇, Shingetsu no sangeki); 87. "Night of Bloody Battle" (血戦の夜, Kessen no yoru); 88. "A Ruler's Generosity" (王者の器量, Ōja no kiryō)
15	June 9, 2021	978-4-06-523427-3; 978-4-06-523568-3 (LE)	October 19, 2021	978-1-64651-295-9
89. "The Pathos of Reminiscence" (追憶の情, Tsuioku no jō); 90. "At Journey's End" (行軍の果て, Kōgun no hate); 91. "Only One Shah" (唯一の国王, Yuiitsu no kokuō); 92. "Night of Solitude" (独りの夜, Hitori no yoru); 93. "Chief of the Bandits" (盗賊の長, Tōzoku no chō); 94. "The Duke's Melancholy" (王弟殿下の憂鬱, Ōtei denka no yūutsu)
16	December 9, 2021	978-4-06-526279-5; 978-4-06-526304-4 (LE)	August 9, 2022 (e-book); September 6, 2022 (physical)	978-1-68491-518-7; 978-1-64651-438-0
95. "The Governor of Gilan's Disquiet" (ギラン総督の動揺, Giran sōtoku no dōyō); 96. "Men of the Sea" (海の男たち, Umi no otoko-tachi); 97. "Legend of the Pirate King" (海賊王の伝説, Kaizoku ō no densetsu); 98. "The Torture of a Civilized Nation" (文明国の拷問, Bunmei-koku no gōmon); 99. "The Pirates' Plot" (盗賊の長, Tōzoku no chō); 100. "The Judgement of a Sovereign" (王弟殿下の憂鬱, Ōtei denka no yūutsu)
17	June 9, 2022	978-4-06-528168-0	April 25, 2023	978-1-64651-638-4
101. "Mortal Enemies" (ギラン総督の動揺, Giran sōtoku no dōyō); 102. "A Time for Parting" (海の男たち, Umi no otoko-tachi); 103. "Holiday for a Prince" (海賊王の伝説, Kaizoku ō no densetsu); 104. "Sibling Reunited" (文明国の拷問, Bunmei-koku no gōmon); 105. "Two Fugitives" (二人の逃亡者, Futari no tōbō-sha); 106. "The Curse of the Royal Line" (王家の呪縛, Ōke no jubaku)
18	December 9, 2022	978-4-06-529947-0; 978-4-06-529984-5 (LE)	July 25, 2023 (e-book); August 1, 2023 (physical)	979-8-88933-117-9; 978-1-64651-968-2
107. "The Shah Goes to War" (王の出陣, Ō no shutsujin); 108. "The Lusitanian Knight's Pride" (ルシタニア騎士の誇り, Rushitania kishi no hokori); 109. "Battle of Shahrud" (サハルードの会戦, Saharūdo no kaisen); 110. "The Holy Voice of God" (神の御声, Kami no onkoe); 111. "Lusitania's Counterattack" (ルシタニアの逆襲, Rushitania no gyakushū); 112. "The Twilight of Shahrud" (サハルードの黄昏, Saharūdo no tasogare)
19	June 8, 2023	978-4-06-531875-1; 978-4-06-531876-8 (LE)	July 23, 2024	979-8-88877-069-6
113. "Drunk with Bloodshed" (流血の酔い, Ryūketsu no yoi); 114. "Guiscard's Trap" (ギスカールの罠, Gisukāru no wana); 115. "Devil's Whisper" (悪魔のささやき, Akuma no sasayaki); 116. "The Land of Beginnings" (始まりの地, Hajimari no ji); 117. "Atropatene Rematch" (アトロパテネの再戦, Atoropatene no saisen); 118. "Prayer for the Present" (今際の祈り, Imawa no inori)
20	January 9, 2024	978-4-06-533889-6; 978-4-06-533888-9 (LE)	November 26, 2024	979-8-88877-305-5
119. "Bodin's Assault" (ボダンの襲撃, Bodan no shūgeki); 120. "Devil in Black" (黒衣の悪魔, Kokui no Akuma); 121. "Bottom of Hell" (地獄の底, Jigoku no Soko); 122. "Sunset over Lusitania" (ルシタニアの落日, Rushitania no Rakujitsu); 123. "The Lonely Throne" (孤独の玉座, Kodoku no Gyokuza); 124. "The Parsian Royal Line Revealed" (パルス王家の真実, Parusu Ōke no Shinjitsu)
21	August 7, 2024	978-4-06-536516-8; 978-4-06-536524-3 (LE)	December 2, 2025	979-8-88877-441-0
125. "The Secrets of Birth" (出生の秘密, Shussei no Himitsu); 126. "The Royal Sword" (王家の剣, Ōke no Ken); 127. "The Legend of the Snake King" (蛇王の伝説, Hebiō no Densetsu); 128. "The Coronation Ceremony" (戴冠の儀, Taikan no gi); 129. "The Voice of the People" (民の声, Min no Koe); 130. "The Decisive Battle's Outcome" (決闘の行方, Kettō no Yukue)
22	March 7, 2025	978-4-06-538721-4; 978-4-06-538723-8 (LE)	March 3, 2026	979-8-88877-648-3
131. "Tāyaminairi – The Tower Where Two Kings Fell" (二王墜死の塔(ターヤミーナイリ), Niō tshuishi no Tāyaminairi); 132. "Warriors from Beyond the Grave" (隠り世の戦士, Kakureyo no Senshi); 133. "Dark Clouds over Ecbatana" (暗雲のエクバターナ, An'un no Ekubatāna); 134. "The Ghost of Atropatene" (アトロパテネの亡霊, Atoropatene no Bōrei); 135. "Knight's Pride" (騎士の誇り, Kishi no Hokori); 136. "The Unlucky Knight" (不退の騎士, Futai no Kishi)
23	September 9, 2025	978-4-06-540658-8; 978-4-06-540697-7 (LE)	—	—
137. "A Warrior's Place of Death" (武人の死に場所, Bujin no Shinibasho); 138. "A Loyal Vassal" (忠義の臣, Chūgi no Shin); 139. "The Final Curse" (最後の呪い, Saigo no Noroi); 140. "A Brother's Regrets" (兄の未練, Ani no Miren); 141. "The Wolf's Dream" (狼の夢, Ōkami no Yume); 142. "Ruler and Subject Decide" (君臣の決断, Kunshin no Ketsudan)
24	March 9, 2026	978-4-06-542963-1; 978-4-06-542961-7 (LE)	—	—
143. "Return of the Snake King" (蛇王の帰還, Hebiō no Kikan); 144. "The Erān's Demise" (大将軍(エーラーン)の最期, Ērān no Saigo); 145. "The Serpent's Venom" (蛇の毒, Hebi no Doku); 146. "Palace of Chaos" (混沌の王宮, Konton no Ōkyū); 147. "Code of the Zot Clan" (ゾット族の掟, Zotto-zoku no Okite); 148. "The King's Gate" (王の門, Ō no Mon)
25	October 8, 2026	978-4-06-544946-2; 978-4-06-544945-5 (LE)	—	—
149. "The Wrath of Heaven" (天の怒り, Ten no ikari); 150. "Where Heroes Finally Go" (英雄たちの逝く処, Eiyū-tachi no iku tokoro); 151. "Succession of Will" (遺言の継承, Yuigon no keishō); 152. "Cannons Sounding the March" (進軍の号砲, Shingun no gōhō); 153. "Wrath of the Snake King" (蛇王の逆鱗, Jaō no Gekirin); 154. "A Loyal Friend in Black" (漆黒の盟友, Shikkoku no Meiyū); 155. "Clash of the Mightiest" (最強の激突, Saikyō no Gekitotsu)

=== Chapters not yet in tankōbon format ===
- 156. "Avatar of Despair" (絶望の化身, Zetsubō no Keshin)
- 157. "The Bloodstained Crown" (血染めの冠, Chizome no Kanmuri)
