= The Heroic Legend of Arslan (TV series) =

Japanese anime television series

アルスラーン戦記 (Arusurān Senki)
- Created by: Yoshiki Tanaka; Hiromu Arakawa
- Anime television series
- Directed by: Noriyuki Abe
- Produced by: Tetsurō Satomi; Toshihiro Maeda; Reo Kurosu; Hirokazu Hara; Tsutomu Yanagimura; Chitose Kawazoe; Yōko Tanaka
- Written by: Makoto Uezu
- Music by: Taro Iwashiro
- Studio: Liden Films; Sanzigen
- Licensed by: Crunchyroll (Note: In North America through Crunchyroll, LLC (formerly known as Funimation).)
- Original network: JNN (MBS)
- Original run: April 5, 2015 – September 27, 2015
- Episodes: 25
- Original video animation
- Directed by: Noriyuki Abe
- Produced by: Reo Kurosu; Chitose Kawazoe; Kensuke Tateishi; Kazuaki Takahashi
- Written by: Makoto Uezu
- Music by: Taro Iwashiro
- Studio: Liden Films; Sanzigen
- Released: May 9, 2016 – November 9, 2016
- Runtime: 25–28 minutes
- Episodes: 2
- Sequel
- The Heroic Legend of Arslan: Dust Storm Dance (2016)
- icon

The Heroic Legend of Arslan (Japanese: アルスラーン戦記, Hepburn: Arusurān Senki; lit. 'Arslan War Records') is a Japanese anime television series based on the manga series The Heroic Legend of Arslan by Hiromu Arakawa, which itself is an adaptation of Yoshiki Tanaka's 1986–2017 novel. The series was produced by Liden Films and Sanzigen, and was broadcast for 25 episodes on MBS from April to September 2015. The series focuses on Arslan, the 14 year old Crown Prince of the Kingdom of Pars, who must protect his Kingdom once his father goes mission in action during a fight. Despite his weak looks and young appearance, Arslan takes it upon himself to create a strong army to protect his home and stop the war.

The series was directed by Noriyuki Abe and written by Makoto Uezu who aimed to create a realistic war story, faithful to Tanaka's original novels. Multiple voice actors worked in the adaptation wth Yusuke Kobayashi taking the leading role whom he describes as an ordinary man as he starts the story as a weak prince but constantly obtains new subordinates which led to befriend the other actors.

Funimation licensed the anime in North America and collected in both two collections and one single Blu-ray. Critical response to series praised the handling of animation and multiple appealing cast characters that defend the Arslan who was the subject of mixed response for not being as appealing as his subordinates. An 8-episode sequel series, titled The Heroic Legend of Arslan: Dust Storm Dance, was broadcast from July to August 2016.

== Premise ==
During his childhood, Prince Arslan from Pars is taught swordmandship by the elder Vazhir to prepare to become a king. One day, he is kidnapped by a child soldier named Etoile, who makes him question his ideals of equality after being told of her relgiion. Four years later, the 14 year old Prince Arslan from Pars embarks on his first fight against Lusitania alongside his father, King Andragoras III. However, the traitor Kharlam alongside the enemy "Silver Mask" takes down the forces of Pars leading to the King's disappearance and Arslan being rescued by his bodyguard Daryun. Daryun takes Arslan to his friend Narsus, a famous tactician and swordsman Arslan convinces to have him join him. Arslan then starts fighting and acquiring new soldiers in order to protect Pars with Narsus' underling Elam. Though outnumbred by Kharlam's forces, Arslan's forces manage to defeat them with the aid of Pars warriors Farangis and Alfreed. When Daryun mortally wounds Kharlam, the enemy uses his last forces to tell that while the king is alive, there is still another man that will take the throne. Following Arslan's victory, the group travels to other areas to obtain new allies and save Pars.

== Production ==
Concept artwork of Narsus and Daryun fighting by Shingo Ogiso who worked carefully combine both traditional animation and 3D especially with Daryun riding a horse.

Although TV series is based on Yoshiki Tanaka's The Heroic Legend of Arslan novels, the series used Hiromu Arakawa's manga adaptation as its basis from 2013. The series was announced in November 2014 by NBCUniversal Entertainment Japan alongside an official website which used images from Arakawa's manga. It was directed by Noriyuki Abe, with scripts by Makoto Uezu. Uezu had read Tanaka's novels since the first Kadokawa Bunko edition was published. He therefore felt more pressure than any other staff or cast member in handling the source material, while also feeling greatly honored by the task. When working on the series composition, he proceeded carefully, respecting the original work while seeking to make the anime distinct. Abe stated that although the work is a "war story", for him it was a "character story" defined by well-developed characters. Several characters were introduced in the first season of the anime before appearing in the original manga, with Arakawa collaborating in creating their designs.

The staff emphasized Arslan's beginning as a beautiful figure and then transforming into a darker character, as highlighted by the opening and video sequences. However, they did not wish to change the protagonist's core, as they wanted him to remain cute. Instead, Daryun and Hermes were the characters whose facial expressions changed. Storyboard artist Naomi Nakayama aimed to show Daryun's devotion to the prince from the early episodes. For the animation, the staff used 3DCG alongside traditional animation.

While coreographing fight scenes, Shingo Ogiso had problems with making some that involve horses. hEe said that from a swordsmanship perspective, Arslan is particularly difficult to design; While the prince is strong, but the balance is difficult because he is weaker compared to Daryun and the others. At the beginning of episodes of the anime he trains with Vahriz, which is divided by a timeskip. At first, Arslan can not even put up a fight against a wooden sword, but the second episode 2, he has grown and is fighting with real swords. And he is even shown to be somewhat on equal footing. Ogiso wanted to make it more than just a simple sword fighta and have a proper basis for its swordplay.

=== Music ===
The music was composed by Taro Iwashiro who had many opportunities to work in neighboring Asian countries, and encounters with people who have different ideologies, religions, and values have become commonplace. This led has make to make a soundtrack that conveys the idea of mutual respect and compassion and furher making it resonate with the modern world. The opening "Boku no Kotoba Dewanai Kore wa Boku-tachi no Kotoba" was made by Uverworld who wanted to compose a theme about struggling. Eir Aoi made the ending theme "Lapis Lazuli" (ラピスラズリ, Rapisu Razuri) with the idea of a passionate line. The second opening theme is "Uzu to Uzu" (渦と渦; "Swirl and Swirl"), performed by Nico Touches the Walls, while the second ending theme is "One Light", performed by Kalafina.

=== Casting ===
Arslan's voice actor Yusuke Kobayashi described the anime as a "classic" war story that everyone can enjoy, finding the multiple characters fascinating and was honored to play the voice of the lead. Daryun's voice actor Yoshimasa Hosoya read the original manga before recording, and got the impression that it was a very solid and interesting work. As for the script script, Hosoya got the feeling that they were trying to create the anime while following the texture and worldview of the original manga but still found it calmer when compared common anime. Voicing Narsus, Daisuke Namikawa called the anime a historically significant work, and was very honored to be involved. Nanikawa said that while the story begins with "adversity" for Arslan and his companions, but the cast members are also facing tough situations. When he received the offer, he was very excited. But when I actually started working on the series composition, I put those feelings aside for a while and proceeded very cleverly.

Kenn researched the manga when cast and was charmed by his character Gieve, another individual who becomes vital in protecting the prince. Abe found the voice actors convincing to fit into the work. Hosoya and Nanikawa labeled their characters as Arslan's parents due to how the oversee the young lead whereas Elam was envisioned as a relatable character. Kobayashi said that his character is a prince who deserves the word "ordinary" but still special because of his companions' loyalty. Finding the original work so excellent, the cast worked with the director to create an anime version of The Heroic Legend of Arslan that is unique to animation, aiming to preserve its charm to the fullest while also making it more exciting and interesting when it becomes an anime. Maaya Sakamoto voiced Farangis whom he found beautiful due to her appearance and stylish personality. Yuki Kaji voiced the antagonistic Silver Mask whom he referred to as a man with his own sense of justice rather than a common villain.

=== Release ===
The series aired from April 5 to September 27, 2015, on MBS's Nichi-5 timeslot and other JNN stations. The 25 episodes were collected in a total of 8 DVD volumes. An original animation DVD (OAD) was bundled with the manga's fifth limited edition volume, released on May 9, 2016.

In North America, Funimation (currently known as Crunchyroll, LLC) announced its license for the series in April 2015, and began a broadcast dub in June of the same year. It was collected in two DVD and blu-ray volumes. In the United Kingdom, the series was licensed by Anime Limited in 2015 but only digitally.

Volume	Date	Discs	Episodes
1	July 23, 2015	1	1–4
2	August 26, 2015	1	5-7
3	September 26, 2015	1	8-10
4	October 23, 2015	1	11–13
5	November 26, 2015	1	14–16
6	December 18, 2015	1	16–18
7	January 27, 2016	1	20–22
8	February 24, 2016	1	23–25

== Episodes ==
No.	Title	Original release date
1	"The Glory of Ecbatana"; Transliteration: "Ekubatāna no Eiga" (Japanese: エクバターナの栄華)	April 5, 2015
Arslan, Crown Prince of the Kingdom of Pars, finds himself in a predicament when a young prisoner from the nation of Lusitania holds him hostage in an attempt to escape. In the course of the adventure, the young prince learns something of the world beyond the Royal Palace.
2	"Age Fourteen, Maiden Battle"; Transliteration: "Jūyon-sai, Uijin" (Japanese: 十四歳、初陣)	April 12, 2015
Now fourteen years old, Arslan takes part in his first battle against Lusitania, and all odds seem weighted in the Parsian army's favor until his father, King Andragoras III, falls victim to an act of treason by one of his generals.
3	"The Knight in Black"; Transliteration: "Kokui no Kishi" (Japanese: 黒衣の騎士)	April 19, 2015
Arslan is rescued by his loyal retainer Daryun. Meanwhile, Lusitanian forces led by General Silvermask ambush the king as he leads what is left of the Parsian army in their retreat from the battlefield.
4	"The World-weary Strategist"; Transliteration: "Ensei no Gunshi" (Japanese: 厭世の軍師)	April 26, 2015
Arslan and Daryun seek the help of the retired tactician Narsus, but convincing him to join their cause will not be an easy task.
5	"The Royal Capital Burns, Part One"; Transliteration: "Ō Toenjō ~Zenpen~" (Japanese: 王都炎上 〜前編〜)	May 3, 2015
While Arslan and Daryun enlist the help of Narsus and his page Elam, Lusitania begins their siege of the royal capital of Ecbatana. The actions of a wandering minstrel named Gieve draw the attention of Queen Tahamine and her advisors. The Lusitanian soldiers call for the slaves inside the walls to join them in exchange for their freedom.
6	"The Royal Capital Burns, Part Two"; Transliteration: "Ō Toenjō ~Kōhen~" (Japanese: 王都炎上 〜後編〜)	May 10, 2015
Gieve escapes Ecbatana after clashing with Silvermask in the tunnel system. Silvermask makes use of the tunnels to strike the palace from within, while the Lusitanian forces, assisted by the slaves, break into the capital and conquer it.
7	"The Beauties and the Beasts"; Transliteration: "Bijo-tachi to Yajuu-tachi" (Japanese: 美女たちと野獣たち)	May 17, 2015
As the Lusitanian army plunders the capital, Gieve meets the beautiful priestess Farangis, who is in search of Arslan. Upon learning that the traitor general Kharlan intends to raid the nearby villages in order to capture them, Arslan and his companions decide to take the fight to the enemy.
8	"The Treasonous Hero"; Transliteration: "Uragiri no Eiyuu" (Japanese: 裏切りの英雄)	May 24, 2015
Kharlan continues his pursuit of Arslan, and is lured into a trap set by Narsus. In the battle that ensues, Arslan's party meets Gieve and Farangis, who join their cause as well. Meanwhile at the capital, Silvermask confronts the captive King Andragoras, revealing his identity and motives.
9	"Beneath the Mask"; Transliteration: "Kamen no Shita" (Japanese: 仮面の下)	May 31, 2015
Daryun and Narsus infiltrate the capital in search of information, coming across Silvermask in the occasion. Arslan has another encounter with the runaway prisoner he met years before.
10	"The Lord and Master of Kashan Fortress"; Transliteration: "Kashān Jousai no Omo" (Japanese: カシャーン城塞の主)	June 7, 2015
Arslan and his subjects seek refuge in Kashan Fortress, which is governed by Lord Hodir. However, it does not take long for the party to realize that Hodir has an ulterior motive for sheltering them, and so take measures to protect themselves.
11	"The Road to Peshawar"; Transliteration: "Peshawāru e no Michi" (Japanese: ペシャワールへの道)	June 14, 2015
On their way to the stronghold at Peshawar, Arslan's party is pursued by a force led by Zandeh, Kharlan's son (who seeks to avenge his father) and they are forced to split up. While escorting Arslan, Gieve learns the true nature of the prince's personality.
12	"A Knight's Loyalty"; Transliteration: "Kishi no Chuugi" (Japanese: 騎士の忠義)	June 21, 2015
Silvermask slaughters a band of nomads and when the leader's daughter, Alfarid, risks her life in order to avenge her father, Narsus appears to rescue her. Meanwhile, the rest of Arslan's party regroups and fights Zandeh's forces, including the mysterious sorcerer that aids him.
13	"Two Princes"; Transliteration: "Oujifutari" (Japanese: 王子二人)	June 28, 2015
Arslan and his companions reach Peshawar in safety, but there is some discord among the generals regarding the prince's request for aid. Uncertain if he is up to the task of liberating the kingdom, Arslan is attacked by Silvermask.
14	"The Foreign Prince"; Transliteration: "Ikoku no Ouji" (Japanese: 異国の王子)	July 12, 2015
Taking advantage of the crisis in Pars, Prince Rajendra, from the Kingdom of Sindhura, commands an army to invade the country from the east, only to be defeated and captured by Arslan's subjects. Knowing that Rajendra is contending for the throne of his own country with his older brother Gadevi, Arslan convinces him to form an alliance.
15	"The Black Leopard of Shindra"; Transliteration: "Shindura no Kurohyou" (Japanese: シンドゥラの黒豹)	July 19, 2015
Arslan and his subjects assist Rajendra's campaign against Gadevi, and are provided with a Sindhuran guide named Jaswant. However, Jaswant is not who he claims to be. Despite this, it does not take long for the party to turn the situation to their own advantage.
16	"Elegy for the Setting Sun"; Transliteration: "Rakujitsu Hika" (Japanese: 落日悲歌)	July 26, 2015
Gadevi commands his army to bring down Arslan and Rajendra's alliance. Believing that he has the Parsian forces isolated, Gadevi sends his main force against Rajendra. However, the Parsians, having outsmarted their enemies once again, join the battle at a critical moment to turn the tables on Gadevi.
17	"The Duel Before the Gods"; Transliteration: "Shinzen Kettou" (Japanese: 神前決闘)	August 2, 2015
A duel is called by the king of Sindhura to settle the dispute between the two princes. Daryun, chosen as Rajendra's proxy, battles Bahadur, a massive and vicious warrior released from prison by Gadevi to be his representative. Daryun is victorious, but Gadevi, not pleased with the result, turns against his own father and Arslan's party must fight for their lives amid the ensuing chaos.
18	"Once Again Across the River"; Transliteration: "Futatabi Kawa o Koete" (Japanese: ふたたび河をこえて)	August 9, 2015
Following his father's death and his brother's execution, Rajendra is crowned the king of Sindhura. Arslan and his army then return to Pars, but Rajendra repays their help with another act of betrayal.
19	"The End of the Winter"; Transliteration: "Fuyu no Owari" (Japanese: 冬の終り)	August 16, 2015
Now with Jaswant in his party, Arslan returns to Peshawar, while back at Ecbatana, Silvermask gathers an army in order to confront the rebellious Lusitanian Temple Knights. However, his ultimate goal remains liberating Pars and taking the throne for himself.
20	"The True Face of a Knight"; Transliteration: "Kishi no Sugao" (Japanese: 騎士の素顔)	August 23, 2015
The forces loyal to Arslan gather in Peshawar in preparation for the battle to retake the capital. However, faced with the issues regarding Silvermask's past and his own uncertain origins, Arslan's resolve falters. He meets a young girl, unaware that she is actually Etoile, the same Lusitanian captive he met when he was a child. Her words inspire him to seek the throne for himself.
21	"A Song of Farewell"; Transliteration: "Wakare no uta" (Japanese: 別れの詩)	August 30, 2015
Arslan begins his march to retake Ecbatana but must separate himself from one of his allies in the face of prejudice on the part of several of his new officers.
22	"The Night Before the Attack"; Transliteration: "Shutsugeki Zen’ya" (Japanese: 出撃前夜)	September 6, 2015
As Silvermask is set to confront Arslan on the battlefield, the latter steels his resolve and his soldiers for the impending battle.
23	"The Battle for the Keep of Saint Emmanuel"; Transliteration: "San emanyueru no kīpu notatakai" (Japanese: 聖マヌエル城の攻防)	September 13, 2015
The battle for the Keep of Saint Emmanuel begins and Zandeh has his face-off against Daryun. Meanwhile, Etoile has another encounter with Arslan and learns his true identity.
24	"The Decisive Battle"; Transliteration: "Kessen" (Japanese: 第二十四章決戦)	September 20, 2015
Arslan is escorted by his subjects deep inside of the Keep of Saint Emmanuel where he confronts Silvermask in an attempt to call his cousin to reason. However, Hilmes refuses to listen and challenges Daryun to a duel.
25	"The Highway of Blood and Sweat"; Transliteration: "Kanketsukouro" (Japanese: 汗血公路)	September 27, 2015
The Keep of Saint Emmanuel is captured by the Parsian army. By Arslan's command, the Lusitanian survivors, including Etoile, are taken with them as they keep marching towards Ecbatana. Meanwhile, Silvermask returns to the capital and forms a treacherous alliance with Prince Guiscard of Lusitania.
OVA	"The Road of Blood and Love"; Transliteration: "Kanketsu Koiji" (Japanese: 汗血恋路)	May 9, 2016

== Reception ==
=== Popularity ===
The series was popular in Japan often being one biggest rated anime on a weekly basis. Similarly, the home media release was popular in Japanese rankings. Producer Daisuke Tsuchida noted response to the TV series was also positive. He believes the staff that managed to accomplish did this are Arakawa for creating an interesting manga as well director Noriyuki Abe who is skilled at directing anime based on shonen manga. The work of character designer Shingo Ogiso was also praised by the producer for making realistic designs which icreases the appeal of Arakawa's designs. The positive reception to the first season led the staff to quickly produce a sequel, The Heroic Legend of Arslan: Dust Storm Dance.

=== Critical response ===
The first season was praised by Theron Martin of Anime News Network, who graded the series as B. Martin described The Heroic Legend of Arslan as a cross between Yona of the Dawn and Guin Saga, noting that while the main character is often less interesting than the supporting cast, it remains an epic fantasy story without romantic subplots and with strong thematic discussions among the cast, including on religion. The English cast received general praise, though Aaron Dismuke's performance as Arslan drew mixed reactions from the writer. Chris Beveridge of The Fandom Post called Arslan a character disconnected from the world, with a predictable narrative role based on the premise of his relationship with his father, the king. The reviewer also stated that the handling of multiple supporting characters is one of the anime's strongest points, and that the antagonists receive distinct characterization as well.

The narrative handling also drew negative responses. Anime UK News's writer IncendiaryLemon was more critical of the first season, citing padding following the first five episodes involving multiple fights between the major characters. The writer found Arslan the most likable character in the series due to his kindheartedness, which makes the viewer root for him, but felt that the rest of the cast, except Gieve, were less entertaining. Mitch Jay of Rice Digital agreed with the pacing of the first season being slow but still praised the production values. However, the reviewer felt the anime changes notably when the narrative provides a major revelation about the main character, giving the series and its lead potential for a shift in writing. Nevertheless, Martin preferred the second half more because of how Arslan's work as leader has been completed leading to interesting scenes with the supporting character Etoile that unnitentionally provide more wisdom on the protagonist. While other supporting cahracters like the antagonistic Silver Mask and organizations seen were also the subject of positive comments, Martin noticed these episodes heavily focus on theme of what is a proper ruler and what weaknesses the title character still suffers to lead the series on his own as he also is overshadowed by his underlings.

When it comes to production values, Rice Digital praised the visuals given to the setting and multiple character designs even if the latter are recycled. Nevertheless, he praised the music and multiple voice actors for the English dub. Martin agreed about the animation and character designs but believed it is more aimed towards a female audience since they designers rely on the bishonen archetype of male characters with handsome faces. He also positively compared the CG animation to the anime Utawarerumono and found the Persia specifically well done. Despite also praising the animation, Beveridge criticized the lack of proper balance when contrasting scene set during daylight and night time. Incendiary Lemon acclaimed the first fights between Pars and Lusitania as one of the best parts from the first episodes due to the appeal of armies of soldiers fighting with a mix of two types of animation. Martin claimed that the animation did not shy away from showing too much blood in combat as well as fanservice in the form of the skimpy design from Farangi.

==== Response in Iran ====
By October 2015, the TV series had become popular in Iran, where it became one of the most recommended anime of the year. Since downloading episodes in Iran takes significant resources, viewers seek to learn about series first on fan websites, and Arslan was reviewed positively, drawing comparisons to Hollywood films like Prince of Persia, 300 and Alexander. However, there were mixed responses about whether other countries should make an Iran-like anime, and there was criticism of the skimpy design of Farangis for not fitting with Iranian civilization. Other negative backlash involved the animators' perceived attempt to trick the female audience as a result of different moralities.
