= Taketora (voice actor) =

Japanese actor, voice actor and narrator (born 1974)

- 武虎
- Born: January 31, 1974 (age 52); Amagasaki, Hyōgo Prefecture, Japan
- Education: Chiba University
- Occupations: Actor; voice actor; narrator
- Agent: Haikyō
- Height: 170 cm (5 ft 7 in)

Taketora (武虎, Taketora; born January 31, 1974) is a Japanese actor, voice actor and narrator. He is affiliated with Haikyō.

== Career ==
His stage name is Taketora.

After graduating from a prefectural high school, he entered Chiba University. He entered the Faculty of Engineering while working part-time.

After graduating from university, he joined a major game company and became a producer. After leaving the company, he joined Kyū Production, and after it dissolved, he moved to Haikyō.

== Filmography ==
=== Television animation ===
2000s

- Transformers: Cybertron (2005) – Soundwave, Mudflap
- Street Fighter IV: The Ties That Bind (2009) – Akuma

2010s

- Fullmetal Alchemist: Brotherhood (2010) – Hakuro, Hohenheim's Master
- JoJo's Bizarre Adventure (2012) – Dire
- Marvel Disk Wars: The Avengers (2014) – Baron Zemo
- Gate: Jieitai Kano Chi nite, Kaku Tatakaeri (2015-2016) - Col. Naoki Kamo
- Is It Wrong to Try to Pick Up Girls in a Dungeon? (2015) – Garneau Belway
- Food Wars!: Shokugeki no Soma (2015–2018) – Osaji Kita
- Marvel Future Avengers (2017) – Klaw
- Hi Score Girl (2018) – Koharu's Father
- Kemono Michi: Rise Up (2019) – Edgar

2020s

- Suppose a Kid from the Last Dungeon Boonies Moved to a Starter Town (2021) – Chrome
- The Way of the Househusband (2021) – Butcher
- Fluffy Paradise (2024) – Las

Unknown date

- Bleach – Nakeem Greendina, Runuganga
- Gabriel DropOut – Vigne's Father
- Golgo 13 – Herman / Hebert
- Guin Saga – Vion
- Heaven's Memo Pad – Nemo
- The Heroic Legend of Arslan – Bahman
- High School DxD – Dohnaseek
- Kaze no Stigma – Takeya Oogami
- Ladies versus Butlers! – Selnia's Father
- Mobile Suit Gundam: Iron-Blooded Orphans – Brooke Kabayan
- Monster Hunter Stories: Ride On – Vim
- Muv-Luv Alternative: Total Eclipse – Olson
- One Piece – Gatz, Jiron
- Re:Creators – Magaki
- Tokyo Ghoul – Taro
- Yu-Gi-Oh! 5D's – Rutger Godwin

=== Theatrical animation ===
- Tekken: Blood Vengeance (2011) – Panda

=== Video games ===
- Street Fighter IV (2008) – Akuma
- Super Street Fighter IV (2010) – Akuma
- Marvel vs. Capcom 3: Fate of Two Worlds (2011) – Akuma
- Ultimate Marvel vs. Capcom 3 (2011) – Akuma
- Asura's Wrath (2012) – Akuma
- Street Fighter X Tekken (2012) – Akuma
- JoJo's Bizarre Adventure: All Star Battle (2013) – Dire
- Final Fantasy XIV: A Realm Reborn (2013) (Patch) – Teledji Adeledji
- Final Fantasy XIV: Heavensward (2015) – Midgardsormr
- Fire Emblem Fates (2015) – Sumeragi, Rainbow Sage
- Tekken 7: Fated Retribution (2016) – Akuma (uncredited)
- Street Fighter V (2016) – Akuma
- Ultra Street Fighter II: The Final Challengers (2017) – Akuma
- Teppen (2020) – Akuma
- The King of Fighters All Star (2022) – Akuma
- Street Fighter 6 (2024) - Akuma
- Pokémon Masters EX (2019) - Lt. Surge

Unknown date

- Arslan: The Warriors of Legend – Bahman
- Final Fantasy XII – Havharo
- Liberation Maiden SIN – Oscar Goldman
- Soulcalibur V – Main Bad Guy/Custom Male Voice

=== Dubbing roles ===
==== Animation ====
- Ben 10 (Heatblast, Diamondhead, Ripjaws)
- Phineas and Ferb (Norm, Candace Flynn (Allergic only))
- Teen Titans (Red Star)
- Ultimate Spider-Man (Absorbing Man)
- Wreck-It Ralph (Ryu, Duncan)
