= Arslan (The Heroic Legend of Arslan) =

Fictional character from The Heroic Legend of Arslan

- The Heroic Legend of Arslan character
- Arslan as drawn by Yoshitaka Amano
- First appearance: The Heroic Legend of Arslan Volume 1, "The Battle of Atropatene" (1986)
- Last appearance: The Heroic Legend of Arslan Volume 16, "The Boundless Horizon" (2017)
- Created by: Yoshiki Tanaka
- Designed by: Yoshitaka Amano
- Voiced by: Japanese: Kappei Yamaguchi (OVA and films), Yusuke Kobayashi (TV series); English: Ben Fairman, Greg Baglia (CPM dub) Aaron Dismuke (TV series)

Arslan (Japanese: アルスラーン, Hepburn: Arusurān), also misspelled "Arislan" in an English dub, is the protagonist of The Heroic Legend of Arslan, a series of light novels written by Yoshiki Tanaka and illustrated by Yoshitaka Amano. He is the crown prince of Pars introduced at the age of 14. During his first battle, his kingdom of Pars is conquered by Lusitania as a result of Kharlan's backstabbing. At first oblivious to the dark parts of Pars, after meeting soldier Etoile, Arslan becomes more aware of the evil his country is capable of and desires to learn about Lusitanian beliefs. He also grows smarter and wiser as journey goes, wanting himself to be a king fit for his people to serve and not despair of. Arslan learns he is not the real son of Andagoras and Tahamine and was adopted from a commoner family in order to fill the place of a male heir based on his similar appearance to Tahamine. The characters appears in multiple adaptations of the novels which take their own takes.

Yoshiki Tanaka created Arslan based on the Persian-inspired mytho and created the fictional character based on his own thoughts. Multiple animated adaptations of the novels have been made with one being based on a manga by Hiromu Arakawa, famous for writing Fullmetal Alchemist.

Each incarnation of the Arslan led to multiple type of responses by publications for manga and anime in regards to his characterization as whether the young prince is able save Pars on his own as well as due to his close relationships with his servants who help him develop his character arc. Nevertheless, some writers have mixed on opinions of wheteher or not Arslan manages ot stand out as a good lead in Arakawa's take.

== Role in The Heroic Legend of Arslan ==
Arslan's story, the crown prince of the kingdom of Pars, and it is divided into two parts. In the first part, Pars is taken over by the neighboring nation of Lusitania after Arslan's father, King Andragoras III, falls victim to a treacherous plot led by some of his most trusted retainers, Kharlam. After barely escaping with his life, Arslan rejoins his loyal servant, Daryun. Backed up by only a few more companions with, including the philosopher and tactician Narsus and his young servant Elam, also Farangis, an aloof, cold priestess, and Gieve, a travelling musician and con-man, Arslan stands against overwhelming odds to assemble an army strong enough to liberate his nation from the Lusitanian army which is led by the elusive warrior known as "Silvermask", who is later revealed to be another contender to Pars' throne. Despite not being the child of Andragoras, Arslan decides that he will take over the Kingdom.

In the second part, Arslan, now king of Pars, divides himself between defending his country against several external threats, including Silvermask, who is still at large, seeking to claim the throne for himself, and addressing the needs and hopes of his subjects. During his time as a king, Arslan ends the slavery in his land, becoming known as "Liberator King" (解放王, Kaihō-ō) by his people. He prioritizes the welfare and equality of his people. The aftermath of the declaration brings complex socio-economic challenges. Arslan also confronts a cult of sorcerers with ancient ties to the Pars Kingdom use dark magic to resurrect the mythical Snake King, Zahhak, and install him as the new ruler of Pars. Arslan manages to defeat Zahhak and save his people but suffers a mortal wound in the process and dies in the final novel.

== Creation ==
In making The Heroic Legend of Arslan, Yoshiki Tanaka made a Persian-inspired mythos through the lens of a young prince, Arslan, fighting to reclaim his throne, blending historical fantasy with moral complexity similar to the nature of the writing of Legend of the Galactic Heroes. When starting writing the novels, was against calling them "fantasy" and instead coined the term of "heroic spectacle romance." Although Arslan is the protagonist, Tanaka said that he also considered writing the antagonistic Silvermask, also known as Hilmes, as the protagonist since he is also a wandering prince regarldess of how cruel he is in the novels. Arslan has the Sixteen Winged Generals, whom he wanted to write before and after joining Arslan due to their deep connection with the lead with the only exception being Gieve. When it comes to Arslan's achievements, in the end the character's politics involving kings. Tanaka was against writing a simplistic ending where Arslan would be able to free all the slaves and have "everything being happily ever after".

=== Hiromu Arakawa's take ===
Arslan's design for Hiromu Arakawa's manga adaptation

Hiromu Arakawa considered the creation of the protagonist a major element that needed to be handled properly which led to the creation of a new chapter in her manga where a younger Arslan is taken hostage by Etoile which Tanaka liked. The staff from the TV series anime emphasized Arslan's beginning as a beautiful figure and then transforming into a darker character, as highlighted by the opening and video sequences. However, they did not wish to change the protagonist's core, as they wanted him to remain cute. Instead, Daryun and Hermes were the characters whose facial expressions changed. Storyboard artist Naomi Nakayama aimed to show Daryun's devotion to the prince from the early episodes. Regarding Arslan, Ogiso focused more on the color choices than the character design itself to bring out his beauty. He also paid attention to this during copyright and animation director revisions. He lightened the hair color, or rather, lowered the hue, drew the main lines of the hair with black pencil, but when coloring, he removed the color from the hair itself to create smooth, flowing feel, making it more androgynous. In balancing the cast, Arslan and Elam have a more distinctive "cute" look, while Daryun and others display a more strong kind.

Producer Daisuke Tsuchida wanted the anime to properly focus on Arslan's drama and his coming-of-age story based on the multiple conflicts he faces and develop a major change in his persona. The early episodes have two breaking points according to the producer; in the second episode, Arslan is betrayed by Kharlan and suffers a major defeat. However, by the eighteth episode the protagonist manages to create his new team that has another fight against the traitor's forces. While coreographing fight scenes, Ogiso said that from a swordsmanship perspective, Arslan is particularly difficult to design; While the prince is strong, but the balance is difficult because he's weaker compared to Daryun and the others. At the beginning of episodes of the anime he trains with Vahriz, which is divided by a timeskip. At first, Arslan can not even put up a fight against a wooden sword, but the second episode 2, he has grown and is fighting with real swords. And he is even shown to be somewhat on equal footing. Ogiso wanted to make it more than just a simple sword fight; he wanted it to have a proper basis for its swordplay.

Writer Makoto Uezu sought to further develop the relationship between Arslan and his subordinates in the second TV series, The Heroic Legend of Arslan: Dust Storm Dance. With the setting changing in the new series, the cast's costumes were designed to be lighter. Uezu received on the feedback from viewers of the first season, which led to expanding on the parts that they enjoyed. He claims they want viewers to like Arslan and his companions even more. The sequel's keyvisual is meant to contrast the original's as it shows the title character in a more dignified and stronger figure when compared to the first TV series.

=== Casting ===
In the original video animation and films, Arslan is voiced by Kappei Yamaguchi. Ben Fairman dubbed him in the films and OVA, from the Manga UK dub while Greg Baglia replace him for the CPM dub. Yusuke Kobayashi was honored to play the voice of the lead. Daisuke Namikawa and Yoshimasa Hosoya labeled their characters as Arslan's parents due to how the oversee the young lead whereas Elam was envisioned as a relatable character. Kobayashi said that his character is a prince who deserves the word "ordinary" but still special because of his companions' loyalty.

Kobayashi stated that by Dust Storm Dance the protagonist had already fully developed his awareness and capabilities as a king in the first work, and that in the second, his words carried even more persuasiveness and strength. These scenes surprised Kobayashi himself, as they also surprised Arslan's closest subordinates, Daryun and Narsus. Other voice actors included Daisuke Namikawa and Yoshimasa Hosoya as Narsus and Daryun, respectively; they felt their characters' relationships with the prince were strong and became softer the more screen time they shared. Aaron Dismuke dubbed Arslan in the English localization of the anime series adaptation by Liden Films.

== Reception ==
Arslan's characterization in the OVA was well received. In "Buried Trasure", Justin Sevakis from Anime News Network felt Arslan was an interesting character in the original video animation (OVA) with a coming-of-age theme as the young protagonist takes a heroic role to save his Kingdom in his father's absence. The claimed that while at first Arslan seems lucky for obtaining so many underlings, the more time passes, Arslan is shown as a more gifted boss with the qualities needed to win the war. He further compared with to a Persian teenager featured in 1985 Silk Road network that suffered a tragic fate and believe Yoshiki Tanaka based on him on such young man. He further praised his characterization in the OVA for being portrayed as an smart teenager despite the viewers' perception and properly fights for his kingdom. Ben Fairman's performance as the protagonist was also seen as a strong performance among other multiple talented actors. Chris Beveridge said Arslan's story has "hype" and felt that he was influenced by Haruki Kadokawa, a Japanese entrepreneur and filmmaker. ScreenRant regarded Arslan as one of the most charming princes in anime due to his gentle personality enough to get approval of the Pars' army even when the King disapproves him as his successor. MangaMax said that besides the changes of names in the OVA's dub, Arslan's story and characterization was poorly translated by the localization and wanted fans of the series to see the proper version of the story should the light novels be trasnlated. Nevertheless, his story was praised for the parallels with real world conflicts and his relationship with Silvermask in a chaotic battlefield. In "Lord Language and the Influence of Archetypes" Arslan and Hilmes are seen as similar figures due to both being heirs to the thrones of Pars, but the latter comes across as a far more destructive individual due to his deliberate actions as a result. Nevertheless, Hilmes is referred as Arslan's shadow due to his parallels.

When it came to Arakawa's maanga, O'Neil from the Fandom Post did not find the main characters particularly appealing at first. Ralindae of Ramen Para Dos observed that Arslan's characterization initially appeared flawed due to his stance on slavery and his inexperience, making his physical and mental growth a central focus of the manga. Erkael comparede supporting characters to those from the Game of Thrones television series, to the point that they often overshadow the prince. In an overview of the manga in general, Peter Fobian of Crunchyroll noted that Arakawa often took liberties when writing the manga, drawing parallels between characters and real-life conquerors such as Alexander the Great thanks to the achievements Arslan manages to obtain in the story. In "Anime For Game Of Thrones Fans", ComicBook.com said that while Arslan is the protagonist of the series, it is his deep relationship with his subordinates the biggest appeal of the series as their bond help the viewers root for him after his family's downfall. The lack of black and white morality in the protagonist was also found interesting as rather than defeating a villain, the concept of the series how the young prince becomes a hero. In later volumes, Real Sound praised Arslan's growth and strength for standing up against King Andragoras III and Arakawa's artwork gives the reader a sese of immersion when reading it.

Theron Martin of Anime News Network noted that while the main character is often less interesting than the supporting cast, it remains an epic fantasy story. Aaron Dismuke's performance as Arslan drew mixed reactions from the writer. Chris Beveridge of The Fandom Post called Arslan a character disconnected from the world, with a predictable narrative role based on the premise of his relationship with his father, the king. Anime UK News's writer IncendiaryLemon found Arslan the most likable character in the series due to his kindheartedness, which makes the viewer root for him, but felt that the rest of the cast, except Gieve, were less entertaining. Martin preferred the second half more because of how Arslan's work as leader has been completed leading to interesting scenes with the supporting character Etoile that unnitentionally provide more wisdom on the protagonist. While other supporting cahracters like the antagonistic Silver Mask and organizations seen were also the subject of positive comments, Martin noticed these episodes heavily focus on theme of what is a proper ruler and what weaknesses the title character still suffers to lead the series on his own as he also is overshadowed by his underlings.

Chris Beveridge from The Fandom Post praised the protagonist's character arc during the second season despite his lack of charisma compared to other characters. The new alliances the protagonist forms also received positive response from the reviewer. IncendiaryLemon noted that Arslan properly developed as a character, Anime UK News lamented the writers did not keep try expand the character especially with the nature of the season where the protagonist is poorly treated by his father.. Maritn liked handling of Silver Mask having a stronger role in the new due to his connection with Arslan enough to be considered his rival despite Etoile filling that role in the first animated work. AnimeUKNews lamented Liden Film never grabbed the franchise again and left the protagonist's story unfinished even after three years of its release which is the time of the review in Europe.
