= List of The Heroic Legend of Arslan characters =

Main characters from the series (Hiromu Arakawa's manga adaptation); from left to right: Elam, Arslan, Daryun (top), Farangis (below), Alfreed (bottom), Gieve (back), and Narsus

The fantasy novel series The Heroic Legend of Arslan, and its adaptations, feature an extensive cast of characters created by Yoshiki Tanaka.

== Main characters ==
=== Arslan ===
Voiced by: Kappei Yamaguchi (films and OVA), Yūsuke Kobayashi (TV anime) (Japanese); Ben Fairman (films and OVA, Manga UK dub), Greg Baglia (films and OVA, CPM dub), Aaron Dismuke (TV anime) (English)

Arslan (アルスラーン, Arusurān) is the crown prince of Pars. Age 14 (Pars era 320). During his first battle, his kingdom of Pars is conquered by Lusitania as a result of Kharlan's backstabbing. He's very gentle-natured and soft-spoken, unlike his father, and is very kind; he cares about those around him and values their lives over his own. At first oblivious to the dark parts of Pars, after meeting Etoile, Arslan becomes more aware of the evil his country is capable of and desires to learn about Lusitanian beliefs. He also grows smarter and wiser as journey goes, wanting himself to be a king fit for his people to serve and not despair of. Later it is revealed he is not the real son of Andagoras and Tahamine and was adopted from a commoner family in order to fill the place of a male heir (the two having previously only had a daughter who was sent away by Andragoras) based on his similar appearance to Tahamine.

=== Daryun ===
Voiced by: Kazuhiko Inoue (films and OVA), Yoshimasa Hosoya (TV anime) (Japanese); Steven Pacey (films and OVA, Manga UK dub), Edward Britton (films and OVA, CPM dub), Ricco Fajardo (TV anime) (English)

Daryun (ダリューン, Daryūn) is Arslan's loyal servant. Known as the Knight in black, he is a fearsome warrior. Age 27 (Pars era 320). At the time of Battle of Atropatene, he is the youngest Marzban. He saves Arslan when he was about to be killed in his first battle. He is the one who suggests Pars retreat in their second war with Lusitania, due to the many unfavorable variables the environment presented, but the concerns fell on deaf ears; his concerns were justified as Pars fell to Lusitania in the battle. He is very protective of Arslan and protects him with all of his being; his uncle Vahrez told him to swear, by his sword, his allegiance to prince Arslan.

=== Narsus ===
Voiced by: Kaneto Shiozawa (films and OVA), Daisuke Namikawa (TV anime) (Japanese); Daniel Flynn (films and OVA, Manga UK dub), Christopher Bevins (TV anime) (English)

Narsus (ナルサス, Narusasu) is the tactician of Arslan's party and an excellent swordsman. The former feudal lord of Daylam and Daryun's friend since their childhood. Age 26 (Pars era 320). He considers himself an artist first and foremost, even though his paintings are terrible. He predicted that Andragoras's disregard for strategy and the situation with the slaves will eventually lead to Pars' ruin. Only joins Arslan's party after the prince says that he would allow him to become the court painter. Until 10, he grew up in the city of Ecbatana and lived as an ordinal citizen as his mother is a free citizen.

=== Elam ===
Voiced by: Nozomu Sasaki (films and OVA), Natsuki Hanae (TV anime) (Japanese); Deborah Makepeace (films and OVA, Young, Manga UK dub), Kristopher Milnes (films and OVA, Manga UK dub), Terri Muus (films and OVA, CPM Dub), Justin Briner (TV anime) (English)

Elam (エラム, Eramu) is a young boy who serves Narsus. His parents were slaves freed by Narsus, hence his loyalty towards his master. Elam also grows into a friendship with Arslan and becomes a friend to him protecting him when his life is ever in danger. He also seeks to travel outside of Pars toward south to study the legendary cities that hold knowledge of old stories. He often competes with Alfreed for Narsus's attention.

=== Gieve ===
Voiced by: Kazuki Yao (films and OVA), Kenn (TV anime) (Japanese); Timothy Bentinick (films and OVA, Manga UK dub), Harry Krause (films and OVA, CPM dub), Jerry Jewell (TV anime) (English)

Gieve (ギーヴ, Gīvu) is a traveling musician and womanizer, who is also a skilled bowman and swordsman. Age 22 (Pars era 320). He joins Arslan's party out of his infatuation with Farangis, but later shows true sympathy for the young prince and is curious about what kind of kingdom he will make.

=== Farangis ===
Voiced by: Masako Katsuki (films and OVA), Maaya Sakamoto (TV anime) (Japanese); Pamela Merrick (films and OVA, Manga UK dub), Simone Grant (films and OVA, CPM dub), Rachel Robinson (TV anime) (English)

Farangis (ファランギース, Farangīsu) is a warrior priestess with an outwardly cold, aloof attitude, sent to assist Arslan on behalf of the Temple of Mithra. Acts as a sisterly figure towards Alfreed. She is also a target for Gieve's flirting, a fact that often irritates her.

=== Alfreed ===
Voiced by: Kumiko Watanabe (films and OVA), Manami Numakura (TV anime) (Japanese); Gwen Jenkins (films and OVA, Manga UK dub), Elisa Wain (films and OVA, CPM dub), Jād Saxton (TV anime) (English)

Alfreed (アルフリード, Arufurīdo) (Note: Also spelled as Alfarid) is the daughter of the chief from the Zott Clan, who's saved by Narsus from Silvermask/Hilmes when the latter killed all her companions including her father. Age 16 (Pars era 320). She's greatly attached to Narsus and even refers to herself as Narsus' wife/mistress, which greatly irks Elam. Initially she does not like Arslan and only follows him because of Narsus. but later she started to accept and even respect Arslan and his vision.

=== Jaswant ===
Voiced by: Hiro Yuuki (films and OVA), Wataru Hatano (TV anime) (Japanese); Matthew Morgan (films and OVA, Manga UK dub), Marcus D. Stimac (TV anime) (English)

Jaswant (ジャスワント, Jasuwanto) is a Shindran soldier sent by Prince Gadevi to infiltrate Rajendra's army. He ends up as Arslan's guide and when he's discovered, Arslan spares him since he empathizes with his situation: he's an orphan raised by Grand Vizier Mahendra, who was like a father to him. He eventually joins the main group, refusing to pledge his allegiance to Pars. but personally swearing loyalty to Arslan to repay the prince's mercy.

== Other characters ==
=== Andragoras III ===
Voiced by: Akio Ōtsuka (films and OVA), Takayuki Sugo (TV anime) (Japanese); Douglas Blackwell (films and OVA, Manga UK dub), Roger Rifkin (films and OVA, CPM dub), Christopher Sabat (TV anime) (English)

Andragoras III (アンドラゴラス, Andoragorasu) is the King of Pars, Arslan's father. Age 44 (Pars era 320). Known for his ruthless and stubbornness and preference of power over strategy, Kharlan's betrayal and Silvermask's knowledge of Parsian tactics led to his and his army's disastrous defeat. He is kept alive as a prisoner after his kingdom's fall. After many months he escapes from confinement, finding his way to Peshawar. He then forces Arslan to recruit an army of 50,000 men for the "crime" of leading Pars army in his absence. It is rumored and later confirmed that he had his older brother, the previous King Osroes, killed in order to assume the throne and claim Tahamenay as his Queen.

=== Tahamine ===
Voiced by: Kazuko Yanaga (films and OVA), Atsuko Tanaka (TV anime) (Japanese); Pamela Merrick (films and OVA, Manga UK dub), Stephanie Young (TV anime) (English)

Tahamine (タハミーネ, Tahamīne) (Note: Also spelled as Tahamenay) is the Queen of Pars and Arslan's mother, with a cold attitude towards him. Age 36 (Pars era 320). She is from the former principality of Badakhshan. Though she was first engaged to the grand vizier of the principality, his lord stole her and the vizier committed suicide. When Pars conquered there, Andragoras brought her to Pars. Though he fell in love with her at first sight, his elder brother took her. After he died, she became Andragoras' wife. Thus, it is said that her striking beauty was the reason for several nobles to betray and kill each other for her hand.

=== Vahriz ===
Voiced by: Masaru Ikeda (films and OVA), Eizou Tsuda (TV anime) (Japanese); Eric Flynn (films and OVA, Manga UK dub), Cole Brown (voice actor) (English)

Vahriz (ヴァフリーズ, Vafurīzu) is Daryun's uncle, who serves as the right-hand man for Andragoras III and swordsmanship instructor for Arslan. Age 65 (Pars era 320). He asks his nephew to give his loyalty to Arslan and protect him at all costs. He was killed by Silvermask.

=== Kharlan ===
Voiced by: Rokuro Naya (films and OVA), Tōru Ōkawa (TV anime) (Japanese); Ray Lonnen (films and OVA, Manga UK dub), Kent Williams (TV anime) (English)

Kharlan (カーラーン, Kārān) is formerly one of Andragoras' loyal retainers, but defects ostensibly to serve Lusitania, but actually to serve Hermes Silvermask. He leads the Parsian Army into a trap, then withdraws his forces from the fight which leads to the kingdom's downfall. He died after a fight with Daryun, but before dying reveals that Andragoras is still alive.

=== Shapur ===
Voiced by: Katsuyuki Konishi (TV anime) (Japanese); Brian Note (films and OVA, Manga UK dub), Josh Grelle (TV anime) (English)

Shapur (シャプール, Shapūru) is one of Andragoras' loyal retainers. Age 36 (Pars era 320). He was captured during the battle of Atropatene and presented at the gates of Ecbatana, where he yells to the soldiers that before he's tortured to death by the Lusitanians, they should kill him. He's put out of his suffering by Gieve.

=== Kishward ===
Voiced by: Daiki Nakamura (films and OVA), Hiroki Yasumoto (TV anime) (Japanese); David Arnold (films and OVA, Manga UK dub), Jarrod Greene (TV anime) (English)

Kishward (キシュワード, Kishuwādo) is one of Pars' Marzban known as the Twin-Blade General and the trainer of the hawks Azrael and Sirrush, that are very fond of Arslan. Age 29 (Pars era 320). He was stationed at the Peshawar Fortress during the Battle of Atropatene. He has a strong sense of responsibility.

=== Kubard ===
Voiced by: Kazuhiro Nakata (films and OVA), Kenta Miyake (TV anime) (Japanese); Jacques LeCan (films and OVA, CPM dub), Chris Ryan (TV anime) (English)

Kubard (クバード, Kubādo) is one of Pars' Marzban known for being a heavy drinker. A one-eyed swordsman known as "Kubard the Braggart". Age 31 (Pars era 320). He survived the battle of Atropatene and went into hiding. While Sam tried to convince him of fighting for Hilmes, he chose to remain neutral for the moment. He reappears to help Pars in the battle of St. Emmanuel.

=== Sam ===
Voiced by: Hiroshi Yanaka (TV anime) (Japanese); Jefferey Schmidt (TV anime) (English)

Sam (サーム, Sām) is one of Pars' Marzban, who nearly got killed during the takeover of Ecbatana. He sworn his loyalty to Silvermask upon knowing of his true identity. He is skilled in commanding the forces for both defending and attacking a castle.

=== Xandes ===
Voiced by: Kiyoyuki Yanada (films and OVA), Masakazu Morita (TV anime) (Japanese); Robert Phillips (films and OVA, Manga UK dub), Clifford Chapin (TV anime) (English)

Xandes (ザンデ, Zande) (Note: Also spelled as Zandeh) is Kharlan's son, who serves Silvermask in hopes to achieve his vengeance against Arslan and Daryun. He wants revenge in hopes of cleaning his father's name. He is good at gaining information. He's apparently killed by Daryun during the battle of Emmanuel, but his body is taken by Arzhang.

=== Lucian ===
Voiced by: Rikiya Koyama (TV anime) (Japanese); Steve Powell (TV anime, season 1), Sean Hennigan (TV anime, season 2) (English)

Lucian (ルーシャン, Rushian) is the Lord of Ray and an ally of Arslan, who chooses to remain loyal toward him despite learning of Hilmes' survival. Older than 50 (Pars era 321). He replaces Narsus as royal scribe in order to give importance to the new allied nobles.

=== Zaravant ===
Voiced by: Yuuki Ono (TV anime) (Japanese); Cris George (TV anime) (English)

Zaravant (ザラーヴァント, Zarāvanto) is son of the Lord Mundhir of Oxus, who joins Arslan's cause. He takes a mutual disliking towards Jaswant for his position in Arslan's inner circle. His impatience almost led to be killed by Lusitania alongside Tus and Esran, only to be saved in time by Arslan's forces. After realizing their mistake, all three generals apologize to the prince, who forgave them.

=== Esfan ===
Voiced by: Katsuyuki Konishi (TV anime) (Japanese); Austin Tindle (TV anime) (English)

Esfan (イスファーン, Isufān) (Note: Also spelled as Isfan) is Shapur's younger half-brother and one of Arslan's new allies. Age 22 (Pars era 320). When he was an infant, he was rescued by Shapur from a winter mountain where he was being cared for by wolves after his mother died there. She was a slave and left in the mountain by the legal wife of the brothers' father. He seems to have a friendly rivalry with Zaravant.

=== Tus ===
Voiced by: Hiroshi Tsuchida (TV anime) (Japanese); Sam Riegel (TV anime) (English)

Tus (トゥース, Tūsu) is a garrison commander of Zara and Arslan's ally. He is good at using an iron chain as a weapon. Unlike Zaravant or Esfan, he's more level-headed and not as upset about his position within the Prince's forces.

=== Irina ===
Voiced by: Akemi Okamura (films and OVA), Ai Kayano (TV anime) (Japanese); Lindsay Seidel (TV anime) (English)

Irina (イリーナ, Irina) is a princess of the small kingdom of Maryam, which was occupied by Lusitania. She lost her sight by illness, but keeps her regal appearance. She met Hilmes when he went into hiding, becoming fond of each other, even promising to take her with him when he (Silvermask), became king.

=== Shagard ===
Voiced by: Takahiro Sakurai (TV anime) (Japanese); Aaron Roberts (TV anime) (English)

Shagard (シャガード, Shagado) is a wealthy merchant from Gilan. He is also an old friend of Narsus from their school days. He looks more aristocratic-like than Narsus. He has a keen intellect and good skill in swordplay.

=== Grahze ===
Voiced by: Kenjiro Tsuda (TV anime)

Grahze (グラーゼ, Gurāze) is a captain of a merchant vessel. He is an ideal 'seaman,' as he is both a brave fighter and a merchant with high business skill.

=== Merlain ===
Voiced by: Satoshi Hino (TV anime) (Japanese); Brandon McInnis (TV anime) (English)

Merlain (メルレイン, Merurein) is a talented bowman with great eyesight and also a good swordsman. He is a survivor from the Zot tribe and is searching for his younger sister, Alfreed, and also guards Irina during her trip.

=== Silvermask ===
Voiced by: Shūichi Ikeda (films and OVA), Yūki Kaji (TV anime) (Japanese); Sean Barrett (films and OVA, Manga UK dub), Oliver Wyman (films and OVA, CPM dub), Vic Mignogna (TV anime) (English)

Silvermask (銀仮面卿, Ginkamen Kyō) (Note: Also known as Lord Silvermask) is the leader of the Lusitanian army and the main antagonist. His true identity is Hilmes (Hermes in the Viewster English subtitled version), Arslan's cousin and the son of Osroes. Age 27 (Pars era 320). He leads the invasion of Pars to reclaim the throne as his father was the rightful king who he believes was murdered by his younger brother Andragoras. He became afraid of fire after the assassination attempt that severely burned the right side of his face.

=== Etoile ===
Voiced by: Mitsuishi Kotono (films and OVA), Yumi Uchiyama (TV anime) (Japanese); Serena Evans (films and OVA, Manga UK dub), Ryan Reynolds (TV anime) (English)

Etoile (エトワール, Etowāru) is a young soldier from Lusitania that is the same age as Arslan. He was taken captive after the first war between Pars and Lusitania, but managed to escape and flee to his home country by using Arslan as a hostage. Three years later, he serves as a page to the king's younger brother. He is the one who sheds light to Arslan that the ways of Pars are not right and holds a firm Yaldaboathian belief that all men are equal. It is later revealed that Etoile is a girl; whose real name is Ester. She cross-dresses as a boy so she can fight with the other knights. Age 14 (Pars era 320).

=== Bodin ===
Voiced by: Koichi Kitamura (films and OVA), Shiro Saito (TV anime) (Japanese); Mark Stoddard (TV anime) (English)

Bodin (ボダン, Bodan) is the Grand Inquisitor and archpriest of Lusitania, and a servant of Lusitania's God: Yaldaboth. He enjoys torturing and killing those he considers "pagan" and is disliked by Guiscard for his extremism. After being defeated by Hilmes, he manages to escape but is left without any power or followers.

=== Innocentius VII ===
Voiced by: Tamio Ooki (films and OVA), Toshiharu Sakurai (TV anime) (Japanese); Jeremy Inman (TV anime) (English)

Innocentius VII (イノケンティス七世, Inokentisu Nanase) (Note: Also spelled as Innocentis VII) is the current King of Lusitania and ruler of occupied Myriam and Pars, and the elder brother of Guiscard. He becomes infatuated with Tahamine at first sight and wishes to marry her, despite her coldness and the advice of his counselors.

=== Guiscard ===
Voiced by: Juurouta Kosugi (films and OVA), Takehito Koyasu (TV anime) (Japanese); Eric Vale (TV anime) (English)

Guiscard (ギスカール, Gisukāru) is the Supreme Commander of the Royal Lusitanian Army and Grand Vizier. He is the brother of the current king of Lusitania, Innocentius VII and serves as his advisor. Age 36 (Pars era 321). Guiscard appears to be the true ruler of Lusitania, since his brother is considered incompetent. He doesn't trust Hilmes, but nonetheless gives him troops in hopes that he and Arslan destroy each other.

=== Montferrat ===
Voiced by: Atsushi Ono (TV anime) (Japanese); Greg Dulcie (TV anime) (English)

Montferrat (モンフェラート, Monferāto) is a Lusitanian General who does not seem to share his country's religious fanaticism.

=== Barcacion ===
Voiced by: Bon Ishihara (TV anime) (Japanese); Jeremy Schwartz (TV anime) (English)

Barcacion (バルカシオン, Barukashion) is a Lusitanian Count and the Commander of the Fortress of Saint Emmanuel. He is Etoile's protector and constantly worries about her. During the fall of the Fortress of St. Emmanuel, he committed suicide as a sign of faith, despite Arslan's attempts to stop him, and died in front of Ester.

=== Shindra ===
Voiced by: Hideyuki Umezu (films and OVA), Kousuke Toriumi (TV anime) (Japanese); Jason Isaacs (films and OVA, Manga UK dub), Michael Gerard (films and OVA, CPM dub), Ian Sinclair (TV anime) (English)

Rajendra (ラジェンドラ, Rajendora) is the second prince of Shindra (Note: Also spelled as Sindhura) who leads an invasion of eastern Pars hoping to take advantage of the political situation. After his invasion is frustrated and he's captured, Arslan forces him to make an alliance with him, offering his help to ascend to the throne over his half-brother Gadevi in exchange for his assistance against Lusitania. After Daryun won the duel before the gods in his name and Gadevi dishonored the decision, he was officially made Crown Prince after arresting his brother. After being crowned, he tried to betray Arslan, only for his plan to be foiled once more and forced to acknowledge a 3 year-long non-aggression treaty between Pars and Shindra. Age 24 (Pars era 320).

=== Gadevi ===
Voiced by: Yukitoshi Hori (films and OVA), Susumu Chiba (TV anime) (Japanese); J Michael Tatum (TV anime) (English)

Gadevi (ガーデーヴィ, Gādēvi) (Note: Also spelled as Gadhevi) is the first Prince of Shindra and Rajendra's older half-brother. His army is known for possessing several war elephants, that not even Andragoras dared to face, until they were defeated in the battle of Changdrapal thanks to the combined efforts of Rajendra and Arslan's armies. When Rajendra won the duel before the gods, he snapped and tried to kill his brother, but when he killed Mahendra the soldiers stopped fighting and then he was arrested for his treason. He is later executed at a banquet held in his honor.

=== Mahendra ===
Voiced by: Tetsuo Kanao (TV anime) (Japanese); John Swasey (TV anime) (English)

Mahendra (マヘンドラ, Mahendora) is the hereditary Grand Vizier of the Kingdom of Shindra and an ally of Prince Gadevi, he's also Jaswant's adoptive father. When he tried to calm Gadevi, he was fatally injured by the First Prince. His last words were to Jaswant.

=== Karikala II ===
Voiced by: Hideyuki Umezu (TV anime) (Japanese); R. Bruce Elliot (TV anime) (English)

Karikala II (カリカーラ二世, Karikāra nisei) (Note: Also spelled as Kalikara II) is the King of Shindra and the father of Gadevi and Rajendra. Since he didn't trust his eldest son, in order to decide his successor he proposed that they settled it with a duel before the gods. When Daryun, Rajendra's champion won and Gadevi tried to kill his brother, Karikala made Rajendra his successor. He passed away after asking Rajendra to spare his brother, a promise he refused to honor.

=== Ilterish ===
Voiced by: Tetsu Inada (TV anime) (Japanese); Tyson Rinehart (TV anime) (English)

Ilterish (イルテリシュ, Iruterishu) is a young general of Turan's large army who invaded Pars while it was still in a panic. He is an ambitious man with a violent temper, and he fights like a warrior gone mad. Those serving him call him by the title "Jinon" (Royal Prince). He murders Tokhtamysh for retreating from the battlefield instead of fighting until the end.

=== Jimsa ===
Voiced by: Sōma Saitō (TV anime) (Japanese); Micah Solusod (TV anime) (English)

Jimsa (ジムサドラ) is a brave Turanian general whose face looks younger than his age. He has relatively small build, which enables him to be agile. He is a good swordsman and also more talented in using a blowgun. He's deceived by Narsus tactics, which accidentally leads his men into attacking his allies, slaughtering both forces.

=== Tokhtamysh ===
Voiced by: Tesshō Genda (TV anime)

Tokhtamysh (トクトミシュ, Tokutomishu) is the King of Turan who gained his position through many years of political strife. He decided to invade Pars in order to strengthen his currently weak political influence. He goes out on the battlefield to fight himself during the battle at Peshawar Castle, but his rash actions lead to his army's defeat by Pars. He's murdered by Ilterish for ordering retreat and trying to negotiate.
