= Shinobu Tanno =

Japanese illustrator

Shinobu Tanno (丹野忍 Tanno Shinobu, born 1973) is a Japanese illustrator, born in Ibaraki Prefecture, Japan. Tanno graduated in 1997 from Ritsumeikan University. Self-taught, Tanno has illustrated in a number of fields, from CD cover design to video game and novel illustration.

== Illustration Works ==
Tanno has contributed to the Guin Saga novel series, written by Kaoru Kurimoto, The Heroic Legend of Arslan novel series, written by Yoshiki Tanaka, the Vandal Hearts video game, and the cover to the single "Mirror" by famous Japanese musician Gackt.
