= The Heroic Legend of Arslan: Dust Storm Dance =

Japanese anime television series

アルスラーン戦記 風塵乱舞 (Arusurān Senki Fūjin Ranbu)
- Created by: Yoshiki Tanaka; Hiromu Arakawa
- Anime television series
- Directed by: Noriyuki Abe
- Produced by: Tetsurō Satomi; Toshihiro Maeda; Reo Kurosu; Hirokazu Hara; Chitose Kawazoe; Yōko Tanaka; Yumi Wakabayashi
- Written by: Makoto Uezu
- Music by: Taro Iwashiro
- Studio: Liden Films
- Licensed by: NA: Funimation; UK: MVM Films
- Original network: JNN (MBS, TBS)
- Original run: July 3, 2016 – August 21, 2016
- Episodes: 8
- Preceded by
- The Heroic Legend of Arslan (2015)
- icon

The Heroic Legend of Arslan: Dust Storm Dance (Japanese: アルスラーン戦記 風塵乱舞, Hepburn: Arusurān Senki Fūjin Ranbu) is a Japanese anime television series. It is an eight-episode sequel to The Heroic Legend of Arslan anime series which is based on Hiromu Arakawa's The Heroic Legend of Arslan manga, a retelling of Yoshiki Tanaka's original novels with the same name. The narrative continues to focus on Arslan's work as the Prince of Pars and how he is sent into exile by his own father, King Andragoras, forcing him to create his own army with several returning characters swearing loyalty to him rather than the king.

Multiple staff members from Liden Films returned to animate the series but with Felix Film's aid. It is directed by Noriyuki Abe and written by Makoto Uezu. Due to the anime's change of setting, the staff worked properly to design different types of clothing fitting for the heated weather in the new areas the cast visits. Yūsuke Kobayashi returns as the lead's voice actor but also has several new members for the characters.

The season was well received by critics for the handling of both Arslan for now having reached the closure of his character arc while having a more refined relationship with the antagonistic Silvermask. However, when it came to production values several critics saw the animation as inferior to the first anime and objected to its low episode count. Despite these issues, the series ends on a cliffhanger and Liden Films never handled the series again, which was another negative part.

== Premise ==
Following the events of the first The Heroic Legend of Arslan, the title character has managed to protect the Kingdom of Pars using his new army. After being kidnapped in a war, King Andragoras III returns to Pars where he resumes his role as the king but exiles his son, the Crowned Prince Arslan. Arslan is sent to exile until he generates his own army but his previous allies join him even if he no longer has power.

== Production ==
The positive reception to the first season of the animated adaptation of Hiromu Arakawa's The Heroic Legend of Arslan manga led the staff to quickly produce a sequel, Dust Storm Dance. Just like the first anime, Dust Storm Dance is originally based on Yoshiki Tanaka's light novel which Arakawa adapted as a manga. The anime was first announced in March 2016 in the official site of the first Arslan series. Despite having multiple staff members, it was broadcast on Sundays at 5 p.m. on MBS and TBS, which is the "Nichigo" timeslot. While the first anime was a collaboration between Liden Films and SANZIGEN, this time Felix Film is replacing SANZIGEN with the 3D computer generated animation. In order to promote it, NBC Universal aired gag video of the returning cast working in modern life.

For the second season, returning director Noriyuki Abe said the staff aimed to give each season a distinct setting as well as a different story. They created appealing fight scenes by experimenting with different visual styles. Writer Makoto Uezu sought to focus more heavily on Narsus and to further develop the relationship between Arslan and his subordinates. With the setting changing in the new series, the cast's costumes were designed to be lighter. Uezu received the feedback from viewers of the first season, which led to expanding on the parts that they enjoyed. He claims they want viewers to like Arslan and his companions even more. Since this season only has eight episodes, they took advantage of that and decided to include an episode set in a port town, which was not originally planned. Meanwhile, the characters were designed by Shingo Ogiso, who created different outfits under the supervision of Arakawa. The new series featured several new characters. Ogiso commented characters like Merlein and Princess Irina are very unique and charming. The sequel's keyvisual is meant to contrast the original's as it shows the title character in a more dignified and stronger figure when compared to the first TV series. Ogiso noted that due to the new setting explored characters like Narsus and Farsus wear skimpier outfits.

Kyo Yamashita and Tatsuya Shimano were the new directors of modeling. Eir Aoi and Kalafina returned as the main singers of the series; the opening theme is "Tsubasa" and the ending theme is "blaze", respectively. The "Tsubasa" single reached number 9 on Oricon, 5 on Japan Hot 100, and 2 on Japan Hot Animation having spent 9, 9 and 7 weeks respectively. Taro Iwashiro also returned as composer.

=== Casting ===
Multiple actors reprised their original characters. Yūsuke Kobayashi voiced Arslan in Japanese. He stated that the protagonist had already fully developed his awareness and capabilities as a king in the first work, and that in the second, his words carried even more persuasiveness and strength. These scenes surprised Kobayashi himself, as they also surprised Arslan's closest subordinates, Daryun and Narsus. Other voice actors included Daisuke Namikawa and Yoshimasa Hosoya as Narsus and Daryun, respectively; they felt their characters' relationships with the prince were strong and became softer the more screen time they shared. Returning as Etoile, Yumi Uchiyama noted that there were few female voice actresses. Yuki Kaji looked forward to Hilmes being explored more especially with his sense of justice.

=== Release ===
The series aired from July 3 to August 21, 2016. An original animation DVD (OAD) was released on November 9, 2016. Funimation licensed the series in North America. MVM licensed the series in May 2018.

Volume	Date	Discs	Episodes
1	September 7, 2016	1	1–2
2	October 5, 2016	1	3-4
3	November 18, 2016	1	5–6
4	December 7, 2016	1	7–8

== Episodes ==
No.	Title	Original release date
1	"The Turanian Army Invades"; Transliteration: "Touraan-gun Shinkou" (Japanese: トゥラーン軍侵攻)	July 3, 2016
Arslan's forces double back to Peshawar in order to repel an invasion from the country of Turan, while Gieve follows Silvermask into an ancient tomb. The two battle for possession of an ancient relic that would strengthen a claimant's right to the throne, until it is stolen away by the Temple Knights. Back at Ecbatana, Etoile arrives safely with the rest of the refugees, and King Andragoras takes advantage of a moment of carelessness from Guiscard to take him hostage.
2	"The Monarch Versus the Conqueror"; Transliteration: "Ouja Tai Hasha" (Japanese: 王者対覇者)	July 10, 2016
Andragoras escapes from Ecbatana, taking Tahamine with him. King Tokhtomysh of Turan arrives to lead a second attempt to capture Peshawar, this time executing several civilians in order to provoke Arslan and draw him into open combat. However, Tokhtomysh is forced to flee after underestimating the Parsians and is killed by his own son for his cowardice.
3	"Journey Horse, Sad, and Solitary"; Transliteration: "Seibakoei" (Japanese: 征馬孤影)	July 17, 2016
King Andragoras arrives at Peshawar and promptly assumes command of the army. Arslan is commanded to leave Peshawar without his allies, and not return until he has gathered an army of fifty thousand soldiers, a seemingly impossible task that is tantamount to exile. Disgusted by the unjust nature of the royal mandate, Arslan's friends and advisors defy Andragoras to accompany the prince on his journey.
4	"A City of Land and A City of Water"; Transliteration: "Riku no Miyako to Mizu no Miyako to" (Japanese: 陸の都と水の都と)	July 24, 2016
Arslan's party arrives at the port city of Gilan in search of the reinforcements they need. In the occasion, Narsus meets his old friend Shagad and learns, much to his disappointment, that he is not the same idealistic man he used to be. The viceroy of Gilan is reluctant to give aid because of pirates allegedly attacking merchant ships off the coast. The party is incredulous, until a report arrives of a merchant ship under attack.
5	"Parting of Ways"; Transliteration: "Ketsubetsu" (Japanese: 決別)	July 31, 2016
After driving away the pirates, Arslan and his comrades befriend the grateful merchant captain Grahze. Together, they enact a plan to expose the corruption of Viceroy Pelagius and the other city leaders of Gilan. Meanwhile, to avenge their defeat at the hands of Arslan and his party, the pirate fleet launches an attack on Gilan itself.
6	"Calamity of Kings"; Transliteration: "Retsu-ou no Sainan" (Japanese: 列王の災難)	August 7, 2016
In Ecbatana, Guiscard confines Innocentus VII to his room, assuming command of the Lusitanian forces. To dispose of his brother, he involves Etoile and Irina (a princess of the now defunct kingdom of Maryam, and an old acquaintance of Hilmes) in a plan to kill him. The plot ultimately fails, and Guiscard orders both to be executed, but Hilmes appear to intervene, breaking his ties with Lusitania in the occasion.
7	"The Rainbow City"; Transliteration: "Niji no Miyako" (Japanese: 虹の都)	August 14, 2016
Shagad, the mastermind behind the pirates, devises a scheme to lure Arslan's retainers away from Gilan in order to assume control of the city. However, Narsus, having already grasped Shagad's intentions, outsmarts him with his own plan and confronts his former friend directly. Meanwhile, Etoile reunites with the prince, asking for his help in order to save King Innocentus.
8	"The Dance of Dust Clouds"; Transliteration: "Fuujin Ranbu" (Japanese: 風塵乱舞)	August 21, 2016
After shaking off their pursuers, Hilmes and his men track down the Lusitanian forces that stole the treasured sword and retrieve it, then proceed to launch an attack on Ecbatana. Meanwhile, Andragoras sets off with his army to retake the city as well. Upon learning of this fact, Arslan accedes to Etoile's plea and departs Gilan with his forces, despite knowing that he may be forced to confront his own father in the occasion. As the three armies converge at the capital, Guiscard refuses to concede, and sends the Lusitanian Army against the forces of Andragoras.
OVA	"Banquet of Friendship"; Transliteration: "Yuujou no Utage" (Japanese: 友情の宴)	November 9, 2016

== Reception ==
=== Popularity ===
The first episode of the series appeared in Japan's TV ranking at 9th with a 2.4 rating. The home media release was popular in Japan, appearing in Oricon charts of anime. Kotaku regarded as one of the best anime from 2016 thanks to the fictional elements based on real life and praised the world-building and fantasy. The anime was one of the most highly anticipated works from 2016 according to a Kadokawa research and Anime!Anime!.

=== Critical response ===
When it came to critical response, Chris Beveridge from The Fandom Post praised the protagonist's character arc despite his lack of charisma compared to other characters. The new alliances the protagonist forms also received positive response from the reviewer, who highlighted the commentary on the "next generation" and praised the handling of fight scenes. In retrospect, IncendiaryLemon noted that a major complaint about the anime was the rushed ending of the first season and that the second season still has flaws; the writer believed there was little progress in the second season and that the character development was poorly handled, with the exception of Arslan's rival, Prince Hilmes. After criticizing the animation, the writer concluded that the second season was a weak sequel. While noting that Arslan properly developed as a character, Anime UK News lamented the writers did not try to expand the character especially with the nature of the season where the protagonist is poorly treated by his father. Martin objected to the second season's small number of episodes compared to the first but noted that it retained the strengths of the original anime through its handling of multiple fight scenes while exploring the protagonist's role from a different perspective than his portrayal as a mere dependent in the first season. The handling of Silver Mask having a stronger role in the new due to his connection with Arslan enough to be considered his rival despite Etoile filling that role in the first animated work.

In regards to the production works, Jay's reaction to the second season was more positive, praising the animation that combines 2D and CGI art. The English localization by Funimation was also praised by Jay for delivering strong voice performances, while Martin expressed mixed thoughts about Dismuke's work in the leading role. Besides praise on the art, Martin also liked the animation when it comes to fight scenes. The two theme songs were also praised by the writer. Beveridge says it was a well-designed series, citing the sound effects of horses the warriors ride that give the anime a realistic style. IncendiaryLemon was more negative about Liden Film's work, claiming the animation felt inferior to the first series as CGI and traditional animation no longer mix properly. Moreover, the writer lamented Liden Film never grabbed the franchise again and left the protagonist's story unfinished even after three years of its release which is the time of the review in Europe.
