= Monthly Asuka Fantasy DX =

Japanese manga magazine (1994-2000)

- December 1993 issue, featuring The Heroic Legend of Arslan
- Categories: Shōjo, sci-fi manga
- Frequency: Monthly
- First issue: June 1994
- Final issue: November 2000
- Company: Kadokawa Shoten
- Country: Japan
- Based in: Tokyo
- Language: Japanese

Monthly Asuka Fantasy DX (月刊ASUKAファンタジーDX, Gekkan Asuka Fantajī Derakkusu)—or simply Asuka Fantasy DX or Fantasy DX—was a Japanese shōjo manga magazine published by Kadokawa Shoten. Originally, it was a bimonthly special issue of Monthly Asuka, but was spun off as a separate monthly magazine in June 1994. Manga published in this magazine were published through the Asuka Comics DX imprint from Kadokawa. This magazine published titles of adventure, fantasy, and science fiction such as Angelique and Cowboy Bebop.

== Selected series ==
- The Heroic Legend of Arslan by Chisato Nakamura (1991-1996) (see article image to the right)
- Fire Emblem Gaiden by Masaki Sano and Kyō Watanabe (1992)
- Fire Emblem by Masaki Sano and Kyō Watanabe (1992-1997)
- Angelique by Kairi Yura (1996)
- Magic User's Club by Junichi Sato (1996-1998)
- Messiah Knight: The Vision of Escaflowne by Yuzuru Yashiro (1996-1997)
- Cowboy Bebop by Cain Kuga (1997-1998)
- Record of Lodoss War: Deedlit's Tale by Ryo Mizuno and Setsuko Yoneyama (1998)

== Related magazines ==
- Monthly Asuka
