= The Heroic Legend of Arslan =

Japanese novel series and its franchise

- First volume cover (Kadokawa Bunko original edition), featuring Arslan

アルスラーン戦記 (Arusurān Senki)
- Genre: High fantasy; Historical fantasy; Sword and sorcery
- Novel series
- Written by: Yoshiki Tanaka
- Illustrated by: Yoshitaka Amano (Kadokawa edition); Shinobu Tanno (Kobunsha edition)
- Published by: Kadokawa Shoten; (first edition, vol. 1–10); Kobunsha; (second edition)
- Original run: August 1986 – December 14, 2017
- Volumes: 16
- Anime film series
- Directed by: Mamoru Hamatsu
- Produced by: Yasuhisa Kazama (I); Nagateru Kato (I); Keishi Yamazaki (II); Mitsuhisa Hida (II)
- Written by: Tomoya Miyashita (I); Kaori Takada (I); Megumi Sugihara (II)
- Music by: Norihiro Tsuru
- Studio: Animate Film (I); I.G. Tatsunoko (I); Aubeck (II)
- Licensed by: NA: Central Park Media
- Released: August 17, 1991 – July 18, 1992
- Runtime: 60 minutes
- Original video animation

The Heroic Legend of Arslan (III–VI)
- Directed by: Tetsurō Amino (III & IV); Mamoru Hamatsu (V & VI)
- Produced by: Noriaki Ikeda; Akira Maruta; Kazuhiko Ikeguchi (III); Nagateru Kato (IV–VI); Mitsuhisa Hida (V & VI)
- Written by: Megumi Sugihara
- Music by: Norihiro Tsuru
- Studio: Animate Film; Studio Pierrot (III & IV); Daume (III & IV); J.C.Staff (V & VI)
- Licensed by: NA: Central Park Media
- Released: October 21, 1993 – September 21, 1995
- Runtime: 35 minutes
- Episodes: 4
- Manga
- Written by: Yoshiki Tanaka
- Illustrated by: Chisato Nakamura
- Published by: Kadokawa Shoten
- Magazine: Asuka Fantasy DX
- Original run: 1991 – 1996
- Volumes: 13
- Manga
- The Heroic Legend of Arslan (2013–present)
- Anime
- The Heroic Legend of Arslan (2015); Dust Storm Dance (2016)
- icon

The Heroic Legend of Arslan (Japanese: アルスラーン戦記, Hepburn: Arusurān Senki; lit. 'Arslan War Records') is a Japanese fantasy novel series written by Yoshiki Tanaka. It consists of sixteen novels published from 1986 to 2017. The story and setting are inspired by the history and mythology of ancient Iran. It follows Arslan, the Prince of Pars, as he battles opposing forces following his father's disappearance. The first half of the novel focuses on Arslan as a young prince, while the second half features him as a young adult king who is still dealing with threats to his people.

It was adapted into an anime film duology and a four-episode original video animation (OVA) series released from 1991 to 1995. It was also adapted into a manga series by Chisato Nakamura, which ran in Kadokawa Shoten's Monthly Asuka Fantasy DX from 1991 to 1996. A second manga adaptation, illustrated by Hiromu Arakawa, began in Kodansha's Bessatsu Shōnen Magazine in 2013, which was later adapted into an anime television series in 2015, followed by a second season in 2016.

== Plot ==
The series is set in a legendary amalgamation of ancient Persia and other nearby countries over the course of more than a thousand years. It takes place in a world where magic exists. The story follows the exploits of Arslan, the crown prince of Pars. It is divided into two parts.

In the first part, the neighboring nation of Lusitania takes over Pars after Arslan's father, King Andragoras III, falls victim to a treacherous plot led by some of his most trusted advisors. After barely escaping with his life, Arslan reunites with his loyal servant, Daryun. With only a few more companions backing him up, including the philosopher and tactician Narsus, his young servant Elam, the aloof and cold priestess Farangis, and the traveling musician and con man Gieve, Arslan stands against overwhelming odds to assemble an army strong enough to liberate his nation from the Lusitanian army. The Lusitanian army is led by the elusive warrior known as "Silvermask", who is later revealed to be another contender for the throne of Pars.

In the second part, Arslan, now king of Pars, must defend his country against several external threats, including Silvermask, who is still at large and seeking to claim the throne for himself. At the same time, he must address the needs and hopes of his subjects. During the war, Daryun fought Silvermask, who died in the process. Without Silvermask, the Snake King Zahhāk becomes the Kingdom of Pars's final enemy. However, Daryun dies in combat with the new enemy, prompting Arslan to seek revenge and kill the threat. Arslan is seriously wounded in combat and uses his last bit of strength to tell his people to bury him next to Daryun. After the battle, Pars, Misr, and Maryam perish, leaving Sindhura's kingdom, led by Rajendra, as the main survivor. While the survivors grieve the deaths of King Arslan and his followers, Rostam becomes the successor to the sword Rukhnabad. In the epilogue, Elam dies of old age and meets the spirits of Arslan and his people.

== Production ==
When creating The Heroic Legend of Arslan, Yoshiki Tanaka developed a Persian-inspired mythos centered on the young prince Arslan's struggle to reclaim his throne, blending historical fantasy with moral complexity similar to the writing style of Legend of the Galactic Heroes. The novels were partially inspired by Amir Arsalan, a Persian epic. When Tanaka began writing the series, he opposed labeling them as "fantasy" and instead coined the term "heroic spectacle romance" (ヒロイック・スペクタクル・ロマン). Although Arslan is the protagonist, Tanaka stated that he had also considered making the antagonist Silvermask (also known as Hilmes) the main character, as he is also a wandering prince regardless of his cruelty in the novels. Arslan is accompanied by the Sixteen Winged Generals, whom Tanaka wished to depict both before and after they joined Arslan due to their deep connection with the lead, with the sole exception of Gieve.

The first volume was published in 1986, and the series took 31 years to complete, a delay caused by Tanaka's personal circumstances that prevented him from writing. Tanaka initially conceived the ending first. By around the fourteenth volume, he aimed to conclude the story. In the process, many characters he had originally intended to survive ended up dying instead. He believed they should not die in vain and avoided making their deaths overly tearful, as that would have seemed distasteful. This approach resembled his writing of Legend of the Galactic Heroes, which he sought to write in a somewhat detached manner. Nevertheless, he remained emotionally attached to his characters, which troubled him when he killed them. Although Tanaka sometimes forgot his future plans for the novels, he still managed to foreshadow several major events, a subtlety he hoped readers would appreciate. Regarding Arsla's achievements, Tanaka noted that the character's politics ultimately concern kingship. He rejected writing a simplistic ending in which Arslan would free all the slaves and "have everything end happily ever after."

In August 2017, Tanaka completed the final manuscript for the novels. According to Hiroaki Adachi, the head of the Wright Staff company that manages the business affairs of Tanaka, Tanaka said that only two people besides himself knew the story's ending before its completion. However, when he read the final manuscript, he found that the ending was different from what Tanaka had told him.

== Media ==
=== Novels ===
The novel series The Heroic Legend of Arslan was written by Yoshiki Tanaka. There are a total of sixteen novels, with the first part comprising the first seven novels, and the second part comprising the latter nine novels. The first ten novels were published by Kadokawa Shoten, with cover art illustrated by Yoshitaka Amano, from August 13, 1986, to November 30, 1999. Kobunsha republished the ten novels in a five-two-in-one volume edition, with cover art illustrated by Shinobu Tanno, from February 25, 2003, to February 25, 2005. Volumes 11–16 were released from September 25, 2005, to December 20, 2017.

An art book by Amano, titled Tenma no Yume (天馬之夢; 'The Dream of the Heavenly Horse'), was published by Kadokawa on July 23, 1991. A supplementary book, titled The Heroic Legend of Arslan: A Reader's Guide (アルスラーン戦記 読本, Arusurān Senki Dokuhon), was published by Kadokawa on April 28, 2000.

==== Kadokawa's edition ====
No.	Release date	ISBN
1	August 13, 1986	4-04-166501-9
2	March 12, 1987	4-04-166502-7
3	September 11, 1987	4-04-166503-5
4	August 11, 1988	4-04-166504-3
5	February 22, 1989	4-04-166505-1
6	September 1, 1989	4-04-166506-X
7	March 9, 1990	4-04-166507-8
8	December 3, 1991	4-04-166508-6
9	July 18, 1992	4-04-166509-4
10	November 30, 1999	4-04-166510-8

==== Kobunsha's edition ====
No.	Release date	ISBN
1	February 25, 2003	978-4-334-07506-4
2	February 25, 2003	978-4-334-07506-4
3	May 25, 2003	978-4-334-07516-3
4	May 25, 2003	978-4-334-07516-3
5	August 25, 2003	978-4-334-07531-6
6	August 25, 2003	978-4-334-07531-6
7	November 25, 2003	978-4-334-07543-9
8	November 25, 2003	978-4-334-07543-9
9	February 25, 2005	978-4-334-07553-8
10	February 25, 2005	978-4-334-07553-8
11	September 25, 2005	978-4-334-07619-1
12	December 6, 2006	978-4-334-07644-3
13	October 6, 2008	978-4-334-07677-1
14	May 20, 2014	978-4-334-07722-8
15	May 20, 2016	978-4-334-07730-3
16	December 20, 2017	978-4-334-07735-8

=== Books on tape ===
From November 1988 to January 1994, the first nine volumes were released on cassette tapes by Kadokawa, with the first seven republished as a CD collection in May 1993.

=== Manga ===
A manga adaptation, illustrated by Chisato Nakamura, was published in Kadokawa Shoten's shōjo manga magazine Asuka Fantasy DX from 1991 to 1996, with its chapters collected in 13 tankōbon volumes, released from November 11, 1991, to August 30, 1996.

A second manga adaptation by Hiromu Arakawa started in Kodansha's shōnen manga magazine Bessatsu Shōnen Magazine in July 2013.

==== Volumes ====
No.	Release date	ISBN
1	November 11, 1991	4-04-852323-6
2	May 28, 1992	4-04-852324-4
3	January 29, 1993	4-04-852325-2
4	August 28, 1993	4-04-852326-0
5	August 30, 1993	4-04-852435-6
6	March 29, 1994	4-04-852436-4
7	July 28, 1994	4-04-852504-2
8	November 29, 1994	4-04-852533-6
9	April 3, 1995	4-04-852534-4
10	July 28, 1995	4-04-852534-4
11	October 30, 1995	4-04-852625-1
12	February 28, 1996	4-04-852652-9
13	August 30, 1996	4-04-852653-7

=== Films and OVA series ===
The popularity of the novels led to the creation of two films and a series of OVAs with character designs adapted by Sachiko Kamimura. The films were released from 1991 to 1992 and were produced by Kadokawa Shoten and Sony Music Entertainment Japan.

An OVA series of four episodes that followed up and continues the numbering of the films was released in 1993–1995. Together, they adapt the first five novels.

Both the films and OVA series were licensed by Central Park Media and were released on DVD and VHS. The English dub for Part 1 was produced by Manga UK (who had also licensed the anime in the same region), while Part 2 was dubbed by Central Park Media themselves.

=== Anime ===
An anime television series adaptation, based on Arakawa's manga adaptation, was produced by Liden Films and Sanzigen. The anime consists of two seasons. The first 25-episode season was broadcast from April 5 to September 27, 2015. The second eight-episode season, Dust Storm Dance, was broadcast from July 3 to August 21, 2016. Together, they adapt the first six novels.

=== Video games ===
The first video game based on The Heroic Legend of Arslan was released in 1993 for Sega Mega-CD. A strategy RPG in the vein of similar titles of the era such as the Fire Emblem series, it serves as a companion to the OVA series.

Arslan: The Warriors of Legend, a hack and slash video game developed by Omega Force and published by Koei Tecmo in 2015, serves as a companion to the anime TV series.

The Heroic Legend of Arslan: Warrior's Qualification is a game for smartphones distributed by Sakura Soft. The game was launched on April 27, 2017, and terminated on August 16, 2018. It was based on the manga adaptation by Hiromu Arakawa.

== See also ==
- Aslan (disambiguation)
- Cup of Jamshid
- Fulad-zereh
- Persian literature
- Shamshir-e Zomorrodnegar
- Yona of the Dawn, a manga series with a similar premise
