= Tenjiku Neppūroku =

Japanese manga series

- First tankōbon volume cover

天竺熱風録
- Genre: Adventure; Epic; Historical fantasy
- Manga
- Written by: Yoshiki Tanaka
- Illustrated by: Sei Itō
- Published by: Hakusensha
- Magazine: Young Animal
- Original run: September 9, 2016 – June 14, 2019
- Volumes: 6

Tenjiku Neppūroku (天竺熱風録; lit. 'The Chronicle of the Scorching Winds of India') is a Japanese manga series adapted from the novel of the same name written by Yoshiki Tanaka and illustrated by Sei Itō. It was serialized in Hakusensha's seinen manga magazine Young Animal from September 2016 to June 2019, with its chapters collected in six tankōbon volumes.

== Publication ==
Adapted from the novel of the same name written by Yoshiki Tanaka and illustrated by Sei Itō, Tenjiku Neppūroku started in Hakusensha's seinen manga magazine Young Animal on September 9, 2016. The manga finished serialization on June 14, 2019. Hakusensha collected its chapters in six tankōbon volumes, released from May 19, 2017, to July 29, 2019.

=== Volumes ===
No.	Release date	ISBN
1	May 19, 2017	978-4-592-14853-1
2	September 29, 2017	978-4-592-14854-8
3	February 28, 2018	978-4-592-14855-5
4	August 29, 2018	978-4-592-16254-4
5	February 28, 2019	978-4-592-16255-1
6	July 29, 2019	978-4-592-16256-8
