= The Heroic Legend of Arslan (manga) =

Japanese manga series

- First tankōbon volume cover, featuring Arslan

アルスラーン戦記 (Arusurān Senki)
- Genre: Epic fantasy; Historical fantasy
- Created by: Yoshiki Tanaka
- Manga
- Written by: Hiromu Arakawa
- Published by: Kodansha
- English publisher: NA: Kodansha USA
- Imprint: Shōnen Magazine Comics
- Magazine: Bessatsu Shōnen Magazine
- Original run: July 9, 2013 – present
- Volumes: 25
- Anime television series
- The Heroic Legend of Arslan (2015); Dust Storm Dance (2016)
- icon

The Heroic Legend of Arslan (Japanese: アルスラーン戦記, Hepburn: Arusurān Senki; lit. 'Arslan War Records') is a Japanese manga series by Hiromu Arakawa, based on the 1986–2017 novel series by Yoshiki Tanaka. It has been serialized in Kodansha's shōnen manga magazine Bessatsu Shōnen Magazine since July 2013, with its chapters collected in 25 tankōbon volumes as of October 2026. It is licensed for English release in North America by Kodansha USA. The series follows the life of Arslan, the 14-year-old crown prince of Pars. After his father, King Andragoras III, goes missing in action during a battle, Arslan becomes the designated leader of his country and must protect his people.

The manga was created after discussions on how to adapt the original novel into manga. Arakawa had taken many liberties in creating it, with the approval of Tanaka, who considered her a skilled writer, after reading her previous works. A 25-episode anime television series adaptation, produced by Liden Films and Sanzigen, was broadcast on MBS from April to September 2015. An 8-episode series, titled The Heroic Legend of Arslan: Dust Storm Dance, was broadcast from July to August 2016. A video game, titled Arslan: The Warriors of Legend, developed by Omega Force and published by Koei Tecmo, was released in Japan in October 2015.

The manga was well received, with over 10 million copies in circulation by September 2025. The critical response to the conflict in the story, while also exploring deep themes, was generally positive.

== Plot ==
In the year 317 of the Pars calendar, the western kingdom of Lusitania, a monotheistic realm, invades the eastern kingdom of Maryam to impose worship of Yaldabaoth. Andragoras III, the warrior king of Pars, leads his army to defeat the Lusitanian invaders. He is married to Queen Tahamine and has a son with her, the eleven-year-old Prince Arslan, who is taken hostage by a child from another group named Etoile, but manages to escape. In the year 320, Lusitania, having completed its conquest of Maryam, launches an assault on Pars. King Andragoras III leads his vast army to meet the threat at Atropatene, accompanied by his finest generals, including Kharlan and Daryun, as well as the now fourteen-year-old Prince Arslan. However, a trap set by the traitorous General Kharlan and a mysterious Lusitanian general known only as the Silvermask causes the defeat of the Parsian army.

King Andragoras is captured by the Silvermask. Prince Arslan, whom Kharlan attempts to kill personally, is rescued by Daryun. The two flee to seek out Daryun's friend, the former lord Narsus. Joined by Narsus, his servant Elam, and other companions, the small group embarks on a quest to reorganize the Parsian resistance and liberate the kingdom, even after the capital of Ecbatana falls to the Lusitanians. Arslan must free his country from the invaders and the Silvermask, Hilmes, who is Arslan's cousin. Arslan leads the invasion of Pars to reclaim the throne, as he believes his father was murdered by his younger brother Andragoras. During an encounter with Hilmes, Arslan learns from Narsus that he is not the legitimate heir of King Andragoras but nevertheless decides to protect Peshawar Citadel, a fortress located in Pars. The Keep of Saint Emmanuel is captured by the Parsian army. At Arslan's command, the Lusitanian survivors, including the older Etoile, are taken with them as they march toward Ecbatana.

After escaping his prison, King Andragoras arrives at Peshawar and assumes command of the army. Arslan is commanded to leave Peshawar without his allies and not return until he has gathered an army of fifty thousand soldiers, a seemingly impossible task tantamount to exile. Disgusted by the unjust royal mandate, Arslan's friends and advisors defy Andragoras in order to accompany the prince. After obtaining a large number of warriors, Arslan returns to Peshawar and learns from the Queen that he is an adopted child and is not accepted as the heir. Nonetheless, Arslan declares he will still fight to become king, even if it means confronting his father.

Arslan obtains the sword Rukhnabad, which gives the wielder the legacy of becoming the King of Pars. In order to avoid another war, Arslan challenges the Silvermask to a one-on-one sword fight, which the former wins. Andragoras III then tries to kill his rebellious son, but the King of Lusitania throws both from a cliff. The Queen then appears and finishes her husband. With the King dead, a cult of sorcerers with ancient ties to the Pars Kingdom use dark magic to resurrect the mythical Snake King, Zahhāk, and install him as the new ruler of Pars. Zahhāk possesses Andragoras's body and uses it to kill the Queen. Arslan and Hilmes's forces then confront Zahhāk and his undead underlings. After multiple losses, Arslan tells Etoile to leave, as he and his forces will deal with Zahhāk.

== Production ==
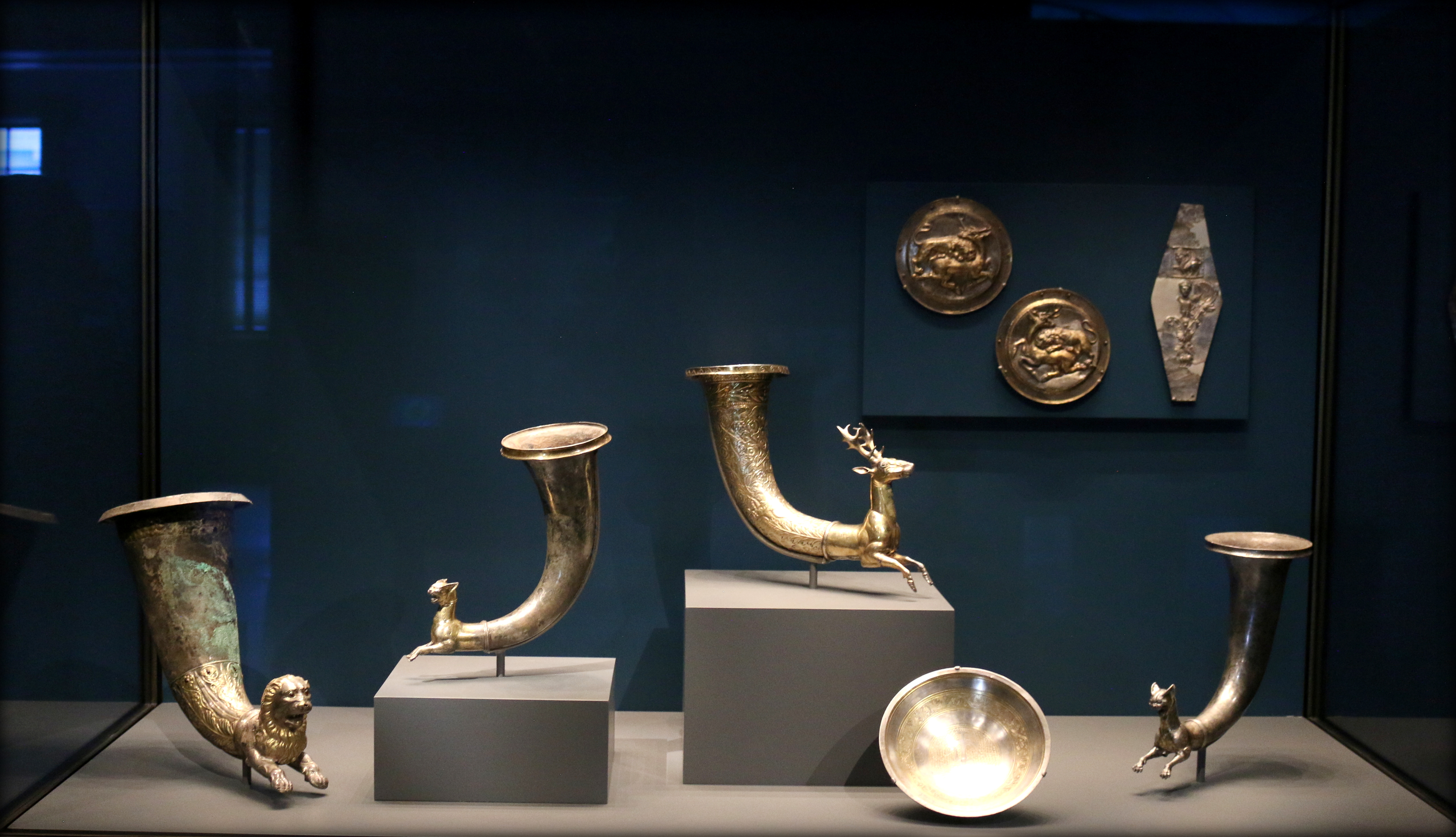
Hiromu Arakawa often researched the Persian Empire for The Heroic Legend of Arslan

Previous discussions had been held about adapting The Heroic Legend of Arslan novel series into manga form. About five years before the adaptation began, manga author Hiromu Arakawa learned of the plan from a managing editor at Kodansha, who contacted her after being informed that she was a big fan of the series, and the editor also relayed this information to the original author, Yoshiki Tanaka. Arakawa denied this, however, and declared that she had never read the series. Nevertheless, she became interested because she was often asked in fan letters whether she liked another one of Tanaka's works, Legend of the Galactic Heroes, and she wondered if it had anything in common with her own approach to create stories. When she was able to read the series, Arakawa noted that she was "carried away" and had soon "devoured all the volumes." Tanaka received a message stating that Arakawa was willing to adapt The Heroic Legend of Arslan. Having prior experience reading her manga series Fullmetal Alchemist and Hyakushō Kizoku, Tanaka was pleased about the collaboration. Tanaka and Arakawa met at a dinner where they immediately started talking about what to include in the manga and how to adapt it. The series was announced by Kodansha's shōnen manga magazine Bessatsu Shōnen Magazine on May 9, 2013.

Arakawa expressed enjoyment regarding researching materials, such as photo collections such as the "Persian Exhibitions" that museums sometimes held, among other items, but she did not know much about the colors of clothing and buildings, so she was worried when she was told to do the work in color. Arakawa commended Tanaka's "developed characters", adding that they have an "amazing power to move stories along." She found it challenging to adapt and create characters in the manga. Since the manga was based on Tanaka's novels, Arakawa felt she could not have devised such character designs independently. She found it challenging to draw well-known figures such as Silvermask and to make them appear compelling, given their strong sense of justice despite their role as antagonists. Arakawa discussed the characterization of Arslan's bodyguard Daryun with her editor and drew inspiration from Zhao Yun of Romance of the Three Kingdoms. Gieve was the only character created primarily by Arakawa herself. Although Tanaka authored the original novels, Arakawa had practiced writing the final chapters from the outset. She also struggled with drawing female characters but attempted to give each her own "distinctive charms".

When Arakawa began writing Silver Spoon, Tanaka noted that she had developed an affinity for horses, which would prove useful for drawing battle scenes involving mounted warriors. Tanaka wanted Arakawa to follow her own creative instincts and draw in her own style. He was already surprised by the prologue and was pleased when she included elements not present in the original script. Arakawa started with the kingdom's structure, including Arslan and his parents, which led to a major war and other foundational elements of the story. Her editor, Hideo Nishimoto, assisted her with the darker elements in the early chapters, as Arakawa felt the second chapter began too calmly. She considered the creation of the protagonist a major element that needed to be handled properly. Four characters were introduced in the anime adaptation of the manga before appearing in the manga itself. Arakawa collaborated with the anime staff to create their designs.

In March 2023, it was announced that the series had entered its "final decisive battle".

== Media ==
=== Manga ===
The manga adaptation of Yoshiki Tanaka's The Heroic Legend of Arslan by Hiromu Arakawa started in Kodansha's shōnen manga magazine Bessatsu Shōnen Magazine on July 9, 2013. Kodansha has collected its chapters into individual tankōbon volumes. The first volume was released on April 9, 2014. As of October 8, 2026, 25 volumes have been released.

In North America, the manga was digitally published in English by Crunchyroll Manga from 2014 until 2018, when the company announced that it would no longer publish manga from Kodansha. Kodansha USA began publishing the manga in print and digital format on August 19, 2014.

=== Anime ===
A 25-episode anime television series adaptation, produced by Liden Films and Sanzigen, and directed by Noriyuki Abe, with scripts by Makoto Uezu, aired from April 5 to September 27, 2015, on MBS's Nichi-5 timeslot and other Japan News Network stations.

An 8-episode second season, titled The Heroic Legend of Arslan: Dust Storm Dance, aired from July 3 to August 21, 2016.

=== Video games ===
A Musou crossover game developed by Koei Tecmo, titled Arslan: The Warriors of Legend, was released on PlayStation 3 and PlayStation 4 on October 1, 2015. The game was released in North America on February 9, 2016, and in Europe on February 12 of that same year.

A smartphone game, Arslan Senki: Senshi no Shikaku (アルスラーン戦記 戦士の資格; 'The Heroic Legend of Arslan: Warrior's Qualification'), distributed by Sakura Soft, was launched on April 27, 2017, and service ended on August 16, 2018.

== Reception ==
Alongside How Are You?, The Heroic Legend of Arslan ranked 17th on Takarajimasha's Kono Manga ga Sugoi! list of best manga of 2015 for male readers. The manga ranked eighth on "Nationwide Bookstore Employees' Recommended Comics of 2015" by the Honya Club online bookstore. The series was nominated for the 42nd Kodansha Manga Award in the shōnen category in 2018. The series ranked 35th on Da Vinci magazine's 17th annual "Book of the Year" 2017 list, and number 45 on the magazine's 2019 list. In 2021, to celebrate the release of the manga's 100th chapter, several manga artists, including Chihiro Ishizuka and Hajime Isayama, drew tribute illustrations to commemorate the occasion.

=== Sales ===
By September 2025, The Heroic Legend of Arslan manga had over 10 million copies in circulation. The third volume of the series received an initial print run of 370,000 copies in circulation for the period between April 2014 and March 2015. The seventh volume of the series had an initial print run of 358,000 copies in circulation from April 2017 to March 2018. The eleventh volume of the series had an initial print run of 265,000 copies in circulation between April 2019 and March 2020.

=== Critical reception ===
Upon the release of the manga's third volume, Clément Derrien of Azu Manga described it as a phenomenon, as its popularity led to an adaptation and a video game. Derrien considered the manga to meet readers' expectations, noting that its conflicts introduced a serious tone that made it a relatively mature title, given the author's limited use of humor. The focus on war, strategy, religion, and political conflicts provided a realistic setting inspired by Persia, avoiding fantasy elements and instead prioritizing human conflicts. The early volumes were praised for their fast pacing, which gave the manga a strong beginning, and Derrien recommended it to fans of war fiction. Kate O'Neil of The Fandom Post stated that Arslan had an appropriately dark start for a war story, based on its action and heavy focus on conflict. Ryūichi Taniguchi of Real Sound wrote that the manga appeared to have garnered a wide readership, which he attributed to its setting—featuring countries modeled after ancient Persia—and its narrative of a crown prince seeking to reclaim his fallen kingdom, elements that could appeal to fans of war stories and historical fiction.

Regarding the cast, however, O'Neil did not find the main characters particularly appealing at first. The stakes of the war were high, with death surrounding the young prince and his loyal retainer. Ralindae of Ramen Para Dos observed that Arslan's characterization initially appeared flawed due to his stance on slavery and his inexperience, making his physical and mental growth a central focus of the manga. Peter Fobian of Crunchyroll noted that Arakawa often took liberties when writing the manga, drawing parallels between characters and real-life conquerors such as Alexander the Great. The manga holds an average score of 17.15/20 on the French review site Manga News, with critic Erkael comparing the supporting characters to those from the Game of Thrones television series, to the point that they often overshadow the prince. Erkael also noted that the series consistently addresses serious themes such as religion, slavery, and oppression, which lend the manga considerable depth. Regarding the manga's more climatic arc, Ryuga Segawa of Real Sound praised Arslan's development and resolve in opposing his father, King Andragoras III, and noted that Arakawa's artwork gave readers a sense of immersion.

Concerning the series' artwork, Rebecca Silverman of Anime News Network appreciated the focus on action scenes, even in the first volume, which she found suitable for fans of epic fantasies. Fobian praised Arakawa's artwork as simple and clean, reminiscent of Western cartoons, rarely employing more detail than necessary and prioritizing familiar, dynamic character designs over elaborate visuals. Derrien noted that Arakawa's art style had matured and remained as dynamic as ever during battle scenes. O'Neil described the action as strong, vicious, and bloody. Erkael also praised the designs of the main cast, likening them to role-playing game archetypes. Ralindae stated that the cast had distinctive designs that would remind readers of Arakawa's previous series, and felt that there were fewer battles early on.
