= Guin Saga =

Japanese novel series by Kaoru Kurimoto

- Cover art of the first Guin Saga novel

グイン・サーガ (Guin Sāga)
- Genre: Epic fantasy; Heroic fantasy; Sword and sorcery
- Novel series
- Written by: Kaoru Kurimoto (1–130); Yū Godai (131–present); Yume Yohino (132, 134, 136, 138, 140)
- Illustrated by: Naoyuki Kato (1–19); Yoshitaka Amano (20–57); Jun Suemi (58–87); Shinobu Tanno (88–present)
- Published by: Hayakawa Publishing
- English publisher: NA: Vertical Publishing
- Imprint: Hayakawa Bunko
- Original run: September 1979 – present
- Volumes: 150
- Novel series

Side Stories
- Written by: Kaoru Kurimoto (1–22); Saori Kumi (23); Osamu Makino (24); Yume Yohino (25); Shinobu Enjōji (26–)
- Published by: Hayakawa Publishing
- Imprint: Hayakawa Bunko
- Original run: February 1981 – present
- Volumes: 27
- Manga

The Guin Saga Manga: The Seven Magi
- Written by: Kazuaki Yanagisawa
- Published by: Media Factory
- English publisher: NA: Vertical Publishing
- Magazine: Comic Flapper
- Original run: 2000 – 2003
- Volumes: 3
- Manga
- Written by: Hajime Sawada
- Published by: Jive
- Magazine: Comic Rush
- Original run: January 2007 – June 2010
- Volumes: 6
- Anime television series
- Directed by: Atsushi Wakabayashi
- Produced by: Hideki Gotō; Katsunori Narumo; Kenjirō Kawando
- Written by: Shōji Yonemura
- Music by: Nobuo Uematsu
- Studio: Satelight
- Licensed by: NA: Sentai Filmworks (expired)
- Original network: NHK BS2
- Original run: April 5, 2009 – September 27, 2009
- Episodes: 26
- icon

Guin Saga (グイン・サーガ, Guin Sāga) is a best-selling heroic fantasy novel series by the Japanese author Kaoru Kurimoto, in continuous publication since 1979. A record 100 volumes were originally planned, but the current total stands at 150 volumes and 27 side-story novels, with the last twenty volumes and six side stories being published posthumously. Kurimoto was working on the 130th volume of Guin Saga up until May 23, 2009, after which point she became too ill to write and died three days later. After the 100th book in the series was published in 2005, an event to celebrate this was held in Tokyo, with 600 attending. Guin Saga is the longest single-writer's work in the world, with total sales of 30 million copies.

The main story of Guin Saga resumed on November 8, 2013, four years after the passing of the original author. Yū Godai published Volume 131 Parro no Ankoku on that date, followed by Yume Yohino's Volume 132 Cylon no Banka in December 2013.

== Plot overview ==
The story centers around a mysterious warrior named Guin, an amnesiac with a leopard mask magically affixed to his head. Remembering nothing but his fighting instincts and the word "Aurra", he confronts a world laden with danger, intrigue, and magic.

== Characters ==
- Guin

Voiced by: Kenyuu Horiuchi (Japanese); David Wald (English)
The title character is a mysterious warrior with the head of a leopard. He stumbles upon Rinda and Remus being attacked by soldiers and defeats the entire unit single-handedly. He remembers nothing of his past, knowing only his fighting instincts, what he believes is his name, and a word: "Aurra". Guin is often put in position where he will suddenly have a skill he doesn't know he has. He understands the language of the Sem. As of Prisoner of the Lagon, he starts to realize that he really is part of the Destiny reshaping the land. Guin is inhumanly strong and knowledgeable about battle strategies, causing the Mongauli army to fear and respect him as a warrior, as he often will set up battle scenarios and jump into battle himself with inhuman skill.

- Rinda Farseer

Voiced by: Mai Nakahara (Japanese); Emily Neves (English)
The Crown Princess of Parros and Remus's twin. She is more independent than Remus. While putting up a strong front for her brother, she is just as devastated over the loss of her homeland. She has prophetic abilities, hence her name "Farseer". According to the novels, she's sure to be one of the top beauties of the land. She has a hatred for Lady Amnelis that is suggested in Warrior in the Wilderness to be partly because they are rivals and opposites in beauty, but mostly because the White Knights that Lady Amnelis commands were responsible for the deaths of her parents. She is a platinum blonde with violet eyes. At the beginning of the story, she is 14.

- Remus Farseer

Voiced by: Tsubasa Yonaga (Japanese); Blake Shepard (English)
The Crown Prince of Parros and Rinda's twin. Although Remus comes off as less courageous than Rinda, it is also suggested in the novels that he is more realistic and more able to understand others. His caution is derived from observation of others. He also reveals secrets accidentally by just talking too much. He apparently can "sense" his sister, and occasionally hear her thoughts (The Leopard Mask). Remus is bitter about not having the gift of farsight, although it is evident he will have other talents. He is a platinum blonde with violet eyes. At the beginning of the story, he is 14.

- Aldross III

Voiced by: Mitsuru Ogata (Japanese); Andrew Love (English)
The father of Rinda and Remus and the King of Parros.

- Istavan Spellsword

Voiced by: Shintaro Asanuma (Japanese); David Matranga (English)
A young mercenary without scruples, but who is portrayed sympathetically. When he was born, he held a jewel in his hand, and a seer predicted that he would one day rule a kingdom and marry the Princess of Light, whom he believes is Rinda. He is nicknamed "The Crimson Mercenary". Istavan is a cunning fellow, and a battle-hardened mercenary by his (approximate) age of 20. He is very mischievous and has a wild sense of humor, finding things outrageously funny. He particularly likes to tease Rinda, and currently has her promise to become Captain of the Holy Guards of Parros, once it is regained. It is implied that he hopes to gain her favor in order to attain her hand in marriage and become a king, even though such a thing is impossible since Rinda must marry someone of noble lineage. He has a sixth-sense about danger, and will often disappear right before a disaster strikes. Although he complains quite a bit, he follows Guin's orders. He is quite proud and overconfident due to the prophecy made after his birth and often attributes random positive events to the fact that he is a future king.

- Black Count Vanon

Voiced by: Masaki Terasoma (Japanese); Jovan Jackson (English)
The Count of Stafolos Keep who is suffering from a plague that causes flesh to fall off. He is discovered to have been possessed by a ghoul, who requires blood of living things to keep him alive. He passes on with Guin's help when Stafolos falls.

- Suni

Voiced by: Sayuri Yahagi (Japanese); Hilary Haag (English)
A member of the monkey-like Sem barbarian tribe. She was being held captive by the Black Count and was liberated by Guin, Rinda, and Remus.

- Lady Amnelis

Voiced by: Akeno Watanabe (Japanese); Elizabeth Bunch (English)
The General of the Mongauli army, the enemies of Parros. She is obsessed with capturing Guin. She even went so far as to find a way to bridge the Kes river and travel into Nospherus, the no-man's land of the Sem to find him. She is considered one of the most beautiful women in the land with her golden hair and green eyes, but has been described as a "Lady of Ice". She also has a small whip on hand that she uses when talking to or lecturing her subordinates. She often involves herself in events seen as too dangerous for a woman of her position with a seemingly overconfident attitude. One that is shattered when Guin easily defeats her in battle and belittles her afterward.

- Astrias

Voiced by: Makoto Ishii (Japanese); Chris Patton (English)
A soldier in the Mongauli army, and known as Gora's Red Lion. He is deeply and obsessively in love with Lady Amnelis, to the point where he kept a lock of her hair that he managed to obtain on his person for quite some time. He is very proud and believes himself to be invincible, and was able to defeat Istavan in single combat. However, in battle he was almost instantaneously knocked aside by Guin twice and told to come back in 20 years.

== Series artists ==
Painted covers and interior illustrations for volumes 1–19 (1979–1984) were done by Naoyuki Kato. Noted artist Yoshitaka Amano then took the reins until vol. 57 (1997), upon which time he was replaced by Jun Suemi. Shinobu Tanno, whose style closely resembles Suemi's, has been the series artist since vol. 88 (2003) until the final 130th book in 2009.

== Media ==
=== Novels released in English ===
American publisher Vertical has released the first five volumes, translated into English by known game translator Alexander O. Smith. The English editions have drawn praise comparing the series to The Lord of the Rings and Conan the Barbarian. The novels have also been translated into German, French, Russian, Italian, Korean and Chinese. The first three novels were released in hardback and paperback editions, the rest only in paperback.

Title	Date	ISBN
The Guin Saga Book One: The Leopard Mask Hyōtō no Kamen (豹頭の仮面)	June 1, 2003 (hardcover); December 11, 2007 (paperback)	978-1-932234-51-0; 978-1-932234-81-7
The kingdom of Parros is attacked by the army of Mongaul, and so Rinda and Remus, the princess and prince of Parros are teleported away by a magic mechanism. They wake up far away from Parros in the Roodwood, which is filled with dangerous spirits and the Mongauli army. They are almost captured by the Mongauli army when a mysterious warrior with the head of a leopard saves them. They give him water, and learn his name - Guin. Night falls and they fight off evil spirits, but are captured in the morning by the Mongauli army, who take them to the Black Count's castle. The Black Count threatens Rinda to get her to reveal the secrets of Parros, though she knows nothing of them, and throws Guin and Remus into the dungeons. There, Guin and Remus meet Istavan, who is trying to escape. He tricks Remus into giving him his bedsheets for rope. Rinda meets and befriends Suni, another captive of the Black Count. The Black Count makes Guin fight a vicious ape, and a soldier throws a sword to him, enabling Guin to kill the ape. The soldier is lowered into the arena, but Guin leaps up to the Black Count and takes him hostage. The Black Count threatens to take off his mask and spread his plague, and Guin is recaptured. Meanwhile, Istavan escapes. Rinda and Suni are menaced by the Black Count, and the Sem attack the castle. The knights are caught by surprise, and open Remus and Guin's cell to keep Remus safe, but they are killed by the Sem. The Sem then attack Guin and Remus, but they outrun the Sem and find Rinda and Suni. The Sem warriors are from an enemy tribe to Suni's and so she cannot tell them to stop. They find a secret door and land in an empty dungeon, which should have been full. Suni is separated from the group, they find her tied up, with the Black Count Vanon ready to kill her to use her blood to treat his rotting disease. Guin reveals the Black Count to be a wraith, and banishes it, and the ghost of the true Count Vanon. Guin carries the twins and Suni out of the dungeon, and to escape the burning castle, jump into the river Kes.
The Guin Saga Book Two: Warrior in the Wilderness Kōya no Senshi (荒野の戦士)	October 1, 2003 (hardcover); January 22, 2008 (paperback)	978-1-932234-52-7; 978-1-934287-05-7
The Guin Saga Book Three: The Battle of Nospherus Nosuferasu no Tatakai (ノスフェラスの戦い)	December 1, 2003 (hardcover); March 4, 2008 (paperback)	978-1-932234-53-4; 978-1-934287-06-4
The Guin Saga Book Four: Prisoner of the Lagon Ragon no Ryoshū (ラゴンの虜囚)	May 13, 2008	978-1-934287-19-4
The Guin Saga Book Five: The Marches King Henkyō no Ōja (辺境の王者)	May 13, 2008	978-1-934287-20-0

=== Manga ===
There are two manga based on the Guin Saga. The Guin Saga Manga: The Seven Magi (グイン・サーガ七人の魔道師) is based on a gaiden (side-story) from the Guin Saga novels, where Guin is now King of Cheironia and must protect his kingdom from a magical plague. The story was originally published as a novel in 1981 and was adapted to manga, which first volume was released in February 2001. It is illustrated by Kazuaki Yanagisawa, was published in Japan by Media Factory, and has been released in English in three volumes by Vertical.

No.	Original release date	Original ISBN	English release date	English ISBN
1	February 23, 2001	4-88991-775-6	December 11, 2007	978-1-932234-80-0
2	January 23, 2002	4-8401-0404-2	January 2, 2008	978-1-934287-07-1
3	January 23, 2003	4-8401-0478-6	March 4, 2008	978-1-934287-08-8

The other manga is based on the early part of the story and is adapted to manga format by Hajime Sawada, as part of the Jive series Kurimoto Kaoru The Comic (栗本薫 The Comic), adapting Kurimoto's works to manga form.

No.	Release date	ISBN
1	January 26, 2007	978-4-86176-365-6
2	December 26, 2007	978-4-86176-422-6
3	October 7, 2008	978-4-86176-573-5
4	April 7, 2009	978-4-86176-649-7
5	October 7, 2009	978-4-86176-724-1
6	June 7, 2010	978-4-86176-769-2

=== Anime ===
On April 12, 2005, Micott & Basara (Japanese investors) announced plans to create an anime based on Guin Saga. In October 2008 more details surfaced which revealed Atsushi Wakabayashi is directing the anime, while famous video game composer Nobuo Uematsu is creating the score. This is Uematsu's first full soundtrack for an anime, and Wakabayashi's first directing role. Animation production was handled by Satelight and the background art by Studio Easter. The anime debuted on April 5, 2009. On April 3, 2009, an English-dubbed trailer was posted on the anime's official website. On May 7, 2010, North American anime licensor Sentai Filmworks announced that they have acquired the series. Sentai, along with distributor Section23 Films, released part one of the series on DVD on March 29, 2011. Section23 had previously announced a Blu-ray release, but it has been postponed indefinitely. On May 8, 2012, Sentai Filmworks released a complete Guin Saga BD Set encompassing the entire series.

The anime uses two pieces of theme music. "Theme of Guin" (グインのテーマ, Guin no Tēma) by Nobuo Uematsu is the series' opening theme, while "Saga~This is my road" by Kanon is the series' ending theme. The soundtrack, comprising two CDs, was released on June 24, 2009.

The anime adapted the first sixteen volumes of the novels.

=== Audio CDs ===
On September 21, 2005, six image albums were released for Guin Saga. There were only 5,000 copies made of each CD. The six CDs were:

- "Guin Saga - Henkyō Hen" (グイン・サーガ辺境篇)
- "Guin Saga - Inbō Hen" (グイン・サーガ陰謀篇)
- "Guin Saga - Senran Hen" (グイン・サーガ戦乱篇)
- "Guin Saga - Graffiti" (グイン・サーガグラフィティ)
- "Guin Saga - Shichinin no Madōshi" (グイン・サーガ七人の魔道師)
- "Guin Saga - Hyōsetsu no Joō / Toki no Fūdo" (グイン・サーガ氷雪の女王/時の封土).

== Reception ==
Berserk creator Kentaro Miura has stated that Guin Saga was a large influence on his work. The books won the 2010 Seiun Award for long fiction. Science fiction critic Mari Kotani regards Guin as "a hero who lives on the border between man and beast". Erin Finnegan from Pop Shock Culture comments that the book "is absolute torture for the first 100 pages, but suddenly at page 105 it turns good". She also comments that the fight scenes, "although cheesy at times", "are all entertainingly well written". The Seattle Times's Nisi Shawl comments that "the book's intense images and dreamlike simplicity give it an anime air".

Jason Thompson of Otaku USA criticises The Seven Magi for trying to summarise a "116 volumes and still going" novel series into a few volumes, which "means a lot of backstory that isn't explained for the casual American reader". Later, writing for the appendix to Manga: The Complete Guide, he found the English dialogue in the series "captures the retro pulp fantasy style almost to the point of self-parody", describing the art as "macho and grotesque", although finding the background art "flat". Thompson also found the story was too open at the end. Ian Randal Strock of sfscope.com commends the manga for its "black-and-white pen-and-ink work".

Theron Martin enjoyed the broadening of scope of the series in the second half of the anime.
