= Arslan: The Warriors of Legend =

2015 video game

- Developer: Omega Force
- Publisher: Koei Tecmo
- Director: Shigeto Nakadai
- Series: The Heroic Legend of Arslan; Dynasty Warriors
- Platforms: PlayStation 3; PlayStation 4; Xbox One; Microsoft Windows
- Release: JP: October 1, 2015; NA: February 9, 2016; EU: February 12, 2016
- Genre: Hack and slash
- Modes: Single-player, multiplayer

Arslan: The Warriors of Legend (Japanese: アルスラーン戦記×無双, Hepburn: Arusurān Senki × Musō) is a hack and slash video game developed by Omega Force and published by Koei Tecmo. It is a crossover between Hiromu Arakawa's manga adaptation of The Heroic Legend of Arslan and Koei Tecmo's Dynasty Warriors series.

== Production and release ==
The video game was first announced in the June 2015 issue of Kodansha's Bessatsu Shōnen Magazine. The video game was later revealed to be developed by Omega Force and published by Koei Tecmo, with Shigeto Nakadai serving as director. It was originally scheduled to release in Japan on the PlayStation 3 and PlayStation 4 on September 17, 2015, but was later delayed to October 1, 2015. Internationally, the video game was released on the PlayStation 3 and PlayStation 4, as well as the Xbox One and Microsoft Windows platforms on February 9, 2016, in North America and February 12, 2016, in Europe.

== Reception ==
=== Critical reception ===
Reception

Aggregate score
Aggregator	Score
Metacritic	PC: 57/100; PS4: 69/100

Review scores
Publication	Score
Famitsu	32/40
GameSpot	7/10
Hardcore Gamer	4/5
Push Square	6/10
The Games Machine (Italy)	6.3/10
USgamer	4/5
Digitally Downloaded	4.5/5

Matt Sainsbury of Digitally Downloaded praised the video game's story, characters, and gameplay, rating it four and a half stars. Mark Steighner of Hardcore Gamer also offered praise for similar reasons to Sainsbury, as well as adding praise for the art style. However, he criticized the video game for being too easy at times. Miguel Concepcion of GameSpot praised the video game for its adaptation of the original source and strong cast of characters, while also criticizing the video game for its lack of an English dialogue. Like previous reviewers, Mike Williams of USgamer praised the voice acting and music, while also criticizing the cast of characters for being too small. Majkol Zaru Robuschi of The Games Machine Italy also praised the story and characters, while also criticizing the video game for running poorly at times. Robert Ramsey of Push Square had similar feelings to other critics, summarizing his thoughts on the video game as "Outside of the plot, things are enjoyable but unspectacular, and by and large, the title feels like the basis for a better sequel".

=== Sales ===
In Japan, the game sold 10,337 and 10,034 copies on the PlayStation 3 and PlayStation 4, respectively, within its first week of release.
