= Yūsuke Kobayashi (voice actor) =

Japanese voice actor (born 1985)

- 小林 裕介
- Born: March 25, 1985 (age 41); Tokyo, Japan
- Occupation: Voice actor
- Years active: 2009–present
- Agent: Yu-rin Pro
- Notable work: The Heroic Legend of Arslan as Arslan; Re:Zero − Starting Life in Another World as Subaru Natsuki; Dr. Stone as Senku Ishigami; Wise Man's Grandchild as Shin Wolford; Fire Emblem as Byleth (male); Monster Strike as Ren Homura; Fire Force as Arthur Boyle; Yona of the Dawn as Su-Won; Our Last Crusade or the Rise of a New World as Iska; How a Realist Hero Rebuilt the Kingdom as Kazuya Souma
- Height: 164 cm (5 ft 5 in)
- Spouse: Yumi Uchiyama (m. 2024)

Yūsuke Kobayashi (小林 裕介, Kobayashi Yūsuke; born March 25, 1985) is a Japanese voice actor from Tokyo, Japan. In 2017, he won the Best New Actor Award at the 11th Seiyu Awards.

== Personal life ==
His wife is fellow voice actress Yumi Uchiyama, they had jointly announced their marriage through their official social media account on December 31, 2024.

== Filmography ==
=== Television animation ===
2013

- A Certain Scientific Railgun S, Shun'ichi Kosako (eps 18–24)
- Golden Time, High School Student (ep 7); Male Student A (ep 2); Student (ep 6), Beautician
- Little Busters! Refrain, Student C (ep 8)
- Strike the Blood, Takashimizu (ep 9)
- White Album 2, Action Committee Member (eps 1, 7); Male Student A (ep 6)

2014

- Argevollen, Tsubasa Yamanami
- Magimoji Rurumo, Tomoha Sakurai
- M3 the dark metal, Schoolboy B
- Nanana's Buried Treasure, Haijiki Sanada
- Selector Infected Wixoss, Kazuki Kurebayashi
- Selector Spread Wixoss, Kazuki Kurebayashi
- Shirobako, Daisuke Hiraoka, Young Masato Marukawa
- Witch Craft Works, Honoka Takamiya
- Yona of the Dawn, Soo-Won
- Your Lie in April, Opponent

2015

- Comet Lucifer, Sogo Amagi
- Food Wars: Shokugeki no Soma, Zenji Marui
- The Heroic Legend of Arslan, Arslan
- Shimoneta, Tanukichi Okuma

2016

- All Out!!, Sekito Kirishima
- Bubuki Buranki, Azuma Kazuki
- Prince of Stride: Alternative, Kaoru Shishibara
- Re:Zero − Starting Life in Another World, Subaru Natsuki
- Show by Rock!!♯, Titan
- The Heroic Legend of Arslan: Dust Storm Dance, Arslan
- This Art Club Has a Problem!, Subaru Uchimaki

2017

- A Sister's All You Need, Itsuki Hashima
- Dive!!, Sachiya Yoshida
- Dynamic Chord, Yakumo Igarashi
- Fate/Apocrypha, Caules Forvedge Yggdmillennia
- Fuuka, Yuu Haruna
- Hand Shakers, Tomoki
- Interviews with Monster Girls, Yusuke Satake
- Sengoku Night Blood, Ranmaru Mori
- Scum's Wish, Takuya Terauchi
- The Saga of Tanya the Evil, Warren Grantz

2018

- Boruto: Naruto Next Generations, Ryougi
- Gundam Build Divers, Riku Mikami
- Hakata Tonkotsu Ramens, Kazuki Saitoh
- Sirius the Jaeger, Philip
- The Seven Deadly Sins: Revival of the Commandments, Gloxinia
- Captain Tsubasa, Makoto Soda
- Yuuna and the Haunted Hot Springs, Yasuhisa-san

2019

- Dr. Stone, Senku Ishigami
- Fire Force, Arthur Boyle
- High School Prodigies Have It Easy Even In Another World, Tsukasa Mikogami
- Isekai Quartet, Subaru Natsuki, Warren Grantz
- Kochoki: Wakaki Nobunaga, Oda Nobunaga
- Mob Psycho 100 II, Toshiki Minegishi
- Stars Align, Nao Tsukinose
- The Case Files of Lord El-Melloi II: Rail Zeppelin Grace Note, Caules Forvedge
- Why the Hell are You Here, Teacher!?, Kō Tanaka
- Wise Man's Grandchild, Shin Wolford

2020

- Darwin's Game, Kaname Sudō
- Interspecies Reviewers, Zel
- Keep Your Hands Off Eizouken!, Robot Club Kobayashi
- Mewkledreamy, Asahi Minamikawa
- Muhyo & Roji's Bureau of Supernatural Investigation Season 2, Daranimaru Goryō
- Our Last Crusade or the Rise of a New World, Iska
- Re:Zero − Starting Life in Another World 2nd Season, Subaru Natsuki
- Sorcerous Stabber Orphen, Majic Lin
- Yu-Gi-Oh! Sevens, Kaizō

2021

- Dr. Stone: Stone Wars, Senku Ishigami
- Higehiro, Hashimoto
- How a Realist Hero Rebuilt the Kingdom, Kazuya Souma
- Mushoku Tensei, Rowin Migurdia
- Show by Rock!! Stars!!, Titan
- Sorcerous Stabber Orphen: Battle of Kimluck, Majic Lin
- Taisho Otome Fairy Tale, Tamahiko Shima
- That Time I Got Reincarnated as a Slime Season 2, Dino
- The Saint's Magic Power Is Omnipotent, Yuri Drewes

2022

- Love After World Domination, Fudō Aikawa
- VazzRock the Animation, Ōka

2023

- Hell's Paradise: Jigokuraku, Yamada Asaemon Tenza
- Ningen Fushin: Adventurers Who Don't Believe in Humanity Will Save the World, Nick
- Paradox Live the Animation, Kanata Yatonokami
- Sorcerous Stabber Orphen: Chaos in Urbanrama, Majic Lin
- Synduality: Noir, Tokio
- The Girl I Like Forgot Her Glasses, Tomo Yasaka
- The Saint's Magic Power Is Omnipotent 2nd Season, Yuri Drewes
- The Vexations of a Shut-In Vampire Princess, Johan Helders
- Beyblade X, Burn Fujiwara

2024

- An Archdemon's Dilemma: How to Love Your Elf Bride, Zagan
- Delico's Nursery, Raphael Delico (Adolescent)
- Go! Go! Loser Ranger!, Footsoldier D
- It Wrong To Try To Pick Up Girls in a Dungeon? V, Hogni Ragnar
- Oshi no Ko 2nd Season, Sakuya Kamoshida
- Re:Zero − Starting Life in Another World 3rd Season, Subaru Natsuki
- Too Many Losing Heroines!, Shintarō Tamaki

2025

- Babanba Banban Vampire, Rihito Tatsuno
- Hotel Inhumans, Ikuro Hoshi
- Welcome to Japan, Ms. Elf!, Kazuhiro Kitase

2026

- An Observation Log of My Fiancée Who Calls Herself a Villainess, Cecil
- High School! Kimengumi, Kai Undō
- The Warrior Princess and the Barbaric King, Karka Lotto
- Iron Wok Jan, Yuji Kawahara
- Re:Zero − Starting Life in Another World 4th Season, Subaru Natsuki
- Super Psychic Policeman Chojo, Meguru Chojo
- That Time I Got Reincarnated as a Slime Season 4, Dino
- The Seven Knights of the Marronnier Kingdom, Mysterious Boy

2027

- Multi-Mind Mayhem, Bard
- A Pen, Handcuffs, and a Common-Law Marriage, Wataru Kashikojima

TBA

- Yumene Connect, Yūhi Takamiya

=== Original net animation (ONA) ===
- Monster Strike (2015), Ren Homura
- A.I.C.O. -Incarnation- (2018), Yuya Kanzaki
- Pacific Rim: The Black (2021), Taylor Travis
- Hetalia: World Stars (2021), Slovakia
- Devils' Crest (2026), Teruki Sugamo

=== Original video animation (OVA) ===
- Nozo×Kimi (2014), Kimio Suga
- Yarichin Bitch Club (2018), Takashi Tōno
- Re:Zero − Starting Life in Another World: Memory Snow (2018), Subaru Natsuki

=== Anime films ===
- Sword Art Online Progressive: Scherzo of Deep Night (2022), Morte
- My Hero Academia: You're Next (2024), Paulo Gorrini
- Witch on the Holy Night (2026), Sōjūrō Shizuki

=== Video games ===
- Warriors All-Stars (2017), Opoona
- Show by Rock!! as Chitan
- I-chu as Kuro Yakaku
- Wind Boys! as Iizuka Minato
- Touken Ranbu, Shinano Toushirou
- Akane-sasu Sekai de Kimi to Utau, Takenaka Hanbei
- Final Fantasy: Brave Exvius, Lasswell
- Granblue Fantasy, Kou, The Hanged Man
- Shin Megami Tensei: Liberation Dx2, Taro Fuse
- Fire Emblem: Three Houses, Byleth (male)
- Super Smash Bros. Ultimate, Byleth (male)
- Fire Emblem Engage, Byleth (male)
- BlackStar - Theatre Starless, Ginsei
- Saint Seiya Awakening/Rising Cosmo, Black Swan
- Helios Rising Heroes as Sage Skyfall
- Altdeus: Beyond Chronos (2020), Yamato Amanagi
- Captain Tsubasa Dream Team, Takeshi Kishida
- Honkai Impact 3 (2021), Kalpas
- Witch on the Holy Night (2022), Sōjūrō Shizuki
- Arknights, Lumen
- Cookie Run: Kingdom, Werewolf Cookie
- Onmyoji, Jinkougyou
- Ys X: Nordics, Glen Berge
- Love and Deepspace, Shen Xinghui (Xavier)
- Bungo and Alchemist, Yamada Bimyou
- Persona 5: The Phantom X, Kiyoshi Kurotani
- Genshin Impact, Mitya
- Final Fantasy Resonance, Lasswell

=== Drama CDs ===
- Yarichin Bitch-bu (2016), Takashi Tono
- Kijima-kun no Kiken na Gakuen-sai Animate Gentei Drama CD (2016), Kishima Kōtarō
- Immoral Triangle" Case1. Gokatei Triangle (2016), Mashiro Shinozaki
- Bokura no Koi to Seishun no Subete CASE:02 Doukyuusei no Bokura (2016), Makoto Irei
- Kikoeru? (2016), Itsuki Sakurabashi
- Gourmet no Fukurami (2017), Ishimori Musashi
- Deichuu no Hasu (2017), Akio Tachibana
- 3-pun Instant no Chinmoku (2017), Aki
- Koubutsu wa Ichiban Saigo ni Hara no Naka (2017), Kazui Sabitada
- Yarichin Bitch-bu 2 (2017), Takashi Tono
- Zantei Boyfriend (2017), Minato Akizuki
- Kakkou no Yume (2018), Hiro Shiratori
- Kuruinaku no wa Boku no Ban: Beta Vol.1 (2018), Sumito Sasabe
- Mo Dao Zu Shi/Ma Dou So Shi (2020), Lan Sizhui/Ran Shitsui
- Otomege Sekai wa Mobu ni Kibishii Sekai desu (2020), Leon Fou Bartfort
- Kimi ni wa Todokanai (2021), Ashiya Kakeru
- Dear Vocalist (2022), KAITO

=== Dubbing ===
==== Live-action ====
- The Edge of Seventeen (Erwin Kim (Hayden Szeto))
- The Night Shift (Devin Lawson (Jake Elliott))
- Summer of 84 (Davey Armstrong (Graham Verchere))
- Vampire Cleanup Department (Tim Cheung (Baby John Choi))

==== Animation ====
- Maya the Bee (Flip)
- Pacific Rim: The Black (Taylor Travis)

=== Multimedia Project ===
- Paradox Live / Cozmez (Kanata Yatonokami)
