= Yoshiki Tanaka =

Japanese novelist

Yoshiki Tanaka 田中 芳樹
- Born: 田中 美樹 (Yoshiki Tanaka); October 22, 1952 (age 74); Hondo, Kumamoto Prefecture, Japan
- Education: Gakushuin University
- Occupation: Writer
- Writing career
- Years active: 1978–present
- Notable works: Legend of the Galactic Heroes; The Heroic Legend of Arslan
- Notable awards: Seiun Award (1988)

Yoshiki Tanaka (Japanese: 田中 芳樹, Hepburn: Tanaka Yoshiki; born October 22, 1952) is a Japanese novelist.

== Life and education ==
He was born in Hondo, Kumamoto Prefecture, and took his doctorate degree in Japanese Language and Literature in the Graduate School of Gakushūin University in Tokyo.

On November 30, 2024, Tanaka suffered from a debilitating cerebral hemorrhage and collapsed, but was promptly brought to the hospital. The brain damage affected his motor functions, forcing him to move to a nursing facility for rehabilitation.

== Writings ==
His major works include the sci-fi space opera novel series entitled Ginga Eiyū Densetsu (銀河英雄伝説), also known as Legend of the Galactic Heroes, and the fantasy novel series Arslan Senki (アルスラーン戦記), also known as The Heroic Legend of Arslan, both of which were adapted as anime and manga. His fantasy works also include the novel series Sohryuden: Legend of the Dragon Kings (創竜伝) that was also adapted as anime.

Tanaka is interested in Chinese history and wrote some novels set in China. He also published two arranged-translations of Chinese literature: "Sui Tang Yanyi" (隋唐演義, "Stories of Sui and Tang Dynasties") and "General Yue Fei" (說岳全傳, "Telling the Complete Biography of Yue Fei") as "Gakuhi-den" (岳飛伝, "The Story of Yue Fei"). He is also familiar with Persian history, although Arslan Senki is inspired by Persian history alongside his own thoughts and imaginations.

=== Major works ===
- Legend of the Galactic Heroes (Ginga Eiyū Densetsu 銀河英雄伝説, 1981–1987) – Adapted into several anime formats by Kitty Film Mitaka Studio, Magic Bus, Artland, Mushi Production, Shaft, Madhouse, and Production I.G.
- The Heroic Legend of Arslan (Arslan Senki アルスラーン戦記, Part One 1986–1990, Part Two 1991–2017) – Adapted into an OVA series by J.C.Staff and a TV series by Liden Films and Sanzigen.
- Sohryuden: Legend of the Dragon Kings (Sōryūden 創竜伝, 1987–ongoing) – Adapted into an OVA series by Kitty Film.
- Tytania (Taitania タイタニア, 1988–2015) – Adapted into an anime TV series by Artland.
- Seven Cities Story (七都市物語, 1990) Chapter one, Arctic Front only adapted into a two-part OVA by Studio Junio.
- Yakushiji Ryōko no Kaiki Jikenbo (薬師寺涼子の怪奇事件簿, 1996–2018) – Adapted into an anime TV series by Doga Kobo.
- Ambition Waltz (Yabou Enbukyoku 野望円舞曲, co-authored with Yuki Oginome)

=== Manga ===
- Tenjiku Neppūroku (2016–2019) (illustrated by Sei Itō; serialized in Young Animal)

== Awards ==
- 1988: Seiun Award for Legend of the Galactic Heroes
