= Food in The Chronicles of Narnia =

Aspect of the Narnia universe

In C. S. Lewis's series of children's books, The Chronicles of Narnia, the depictions of food evoke nostalgia for the simple pleasures missing during post World War II rationing in the United Kingdom, and act as a symbol of positive or negative spiritual nourishment. In Lewis's essay "On Three Ways of Writing for Children", he writes of the food imagery in his books: "I myself like eating and drinking, I put in what I would have liked to read when I was a child and what I still like reading now that I am in my fifties". Themes that literary scholars have identified include the dichotomy of wholesome versus magical foods, and food-as-temptation.

== Context ==
Lewis began writing the first book in the Chronicles of Narnia, The Lion, the Witch and the Wardrobe, in 1939, inspired by the London evacuees he had staying at his Oxford home. But his writing was initially slow, and he only completed the book in the late 1940s, during the period of post-war rationing. The strict control of food made even simple items, such as bread, potatoes, or tea, seem valuable. The Narnia books elevate the value of "good ordinary food," such as the tea, fish and potatoes provided by the Beavers to the children in The Lion, the Witch and the Wardrobe. In the same way, when they are being pursued by the White Witch on Christmas Morning, Father Christmas appears with a pot of tea, and the Beavers prepare sliced ham to make sandwiches for the children. In The Voyage of the Dawn Treader, the wholesome meal Lucy eats with Corakin the Magician, "an omelette, piping hot, cold lamb and green peas, a strawberry ice, lemon-squash to drink with the meal and cup of chocolate to follow," immediately follows her discovery that he is a good magician, and not an evil one as the Duffers had claimed. According to James Herbert Brennan, "the first sense you get in Narnia about Lewis's attitude toward food is an air of profound nostalgia for the lost paradise of a varied, ample diet, and a willingness to wallow in the nostalgia somewhat." In Lewis's essay "On Three Ways of Writing for Children", he writes of the food imagery in his books: "I myself like eating and drinking, I put in what I would have liked to read when I was a child and what I still like reading now that I am in my fifties". The motif of food in Narnia has been considered by some to suggest the value of pleasure, indulgence, and celebration even as it also suggests its role in temptation.

== Themes ==
=== Enchanted and wholesome foods ===
In The Lion, the Witch and the Wardrobe, Lewis draws a contrast between "bad magic" and "good ordinary" food: "There's nothing," the narrator comments on Edmund's inability to enjoy the tea provided by the Beavers, "that spoils the taste of good ordinary food half so much as the memory of bad magic food." In The Voyage of the Dawn Treader, the wholesome meal Lucy eats with Corakin the Magician, "an omelette, piping hot, cold lamb and green peas, a strawberry ice, lemon-squash to drink with the meal and cup of chocolate to follow," communicates her discovery that he is a good magician, and not an evil one as the Duffers had claimed.

=== Tea ===
The prevalence of meals, especially tea, in the Narnia Chronicles is also a trope of British children's literature. Writers such as J.R.R. Tolkien, E. Nesbit and George Macdonald influenced Lewis's sense of how and what to write for children. Food is also a common motif in fairy-tales. In fairy-tales such as "Hansel and Gretel," according to Ansam Khyoon, food is associated with times of famine and danger. It is also sometimes associated with temptation. Mary Werner has argued that Christina Rossetti's lavish depiction of fruit in her poem, "Goblin Market" may have influenced Lewis's portrayal of food as temptation in The Lion, the Witch and the Wardrobe.

When Lucy first steps through the wardrobe she is invited to "a wonderful tea" by Mr Tumnus, the faun, who served her "a nice brown egg...sardines on toast, and then buttered toast, and then toast with honey, and then a sugar topped-cake". This is a classic middle-class British tea, and the simple fresh eggs, buttered toast and sardines would have been out of reach for Lucy, who escapes to Narnia in the midst of the war. The children are also served a hot tea by talking beavers with "a great and gloriously sticky marmalade roll, steaming hot", and other wholesome foods. When they are being pursued by the White Witch on Christmas Morning, Father Christmas appears with a pot of tea, and the talking beavers prepare sliced ham to make sandwiches for the children.

=== Turkish Delight ===
In The Lion, the Witch and the Wardrobe, Edmund accepts a "very sweet and foamy and creamy" drink from the White Witch, followed with "several pounds of the best Turkish Delight". The sweet was a rare luxury in post-war Britain. Its inclusion has become iconic. The release of 2005 adaptation of The Lion, the Witch and the Wardrobe corresponded with a jump in Turkish Delight sales.

The real significance of the Turkish Delight in this episode has been debated. Some interpret it as a representation of uncontrollable desire or greed: the Turkish Delight is said to be enchanted so that anyone who eats it "would want more and more of it, and would even, if they were allowed, go on eating it till they killed themselves". Mary Werner compares it, in this respect, to the fruit in Christina Rossetti's Goblin Market. Michael Ward, however, has argued that the Turkish Delight itself is secondary to the real temptation: the White Witch's promise to make Edmund King.
