= Hiromu Arakawa =

Japanese manga artist (born 1973)

Hiromu Arakawa 荒川 弘
- Born: May 8, 1973 (age 53) Makubetsu, Tokachi Subprefecture, Hokkaido, Japan
- Area: Manga artist
- Notable works: Fullmetal Alchemist; Silver Spoon; The Heroic Legend of Arslan; Daemons of the Shadow Realm
- Children: 3

Hiromu Arakawa (荒川 弘, Arakawa Hiromu; born May 8, 1973) is a Japanese manga artist. She is best known as the creator of the manga series Fullmetal Alchemist (2001–2010), which became a hit both domestically and internationally, and was adapted into two anime television series. She is also known for Silver Spoon (2011–2019), the manga adaptation of The Heroic Legend of Arslan novels (since 2013), and Daemons of the Shadow Realm (since 2021).

== Early life ==
Born on May 8, 1973, in Tokachi, Hokkaidō, Japan, Arakawa was born and raised on a dairy farm with three elder sisters and a younger brother. She aspired to be a manga artist from an early age. Throughout her school years, she would often draw on her textbooks. After graduating high school, she took oil painting classes once a month for seven years while working on her family's farm. During this time, she also created dōjinshi manga with her friends and drew yonkoma for a magazine. Arakawa moved to Tokyo in the summer of 1999.

== Career ==
Arakawa began her career in the manga world as an assistant to Hiroyuki Etō, author of Enix's (Note: Square Enix from 2003 onwards.) Mahōjin Guru Guru. Her own manga Stray Dog was published in Enix's Monthly Shōnen Gangan in 1999. Stray Dog won the ninth 21st Century "Shōnen Gangan" Award. She published one chapter of Shanghai Yōmakikai in Monthly Shōnen Gangan in 2000.

=== Fullmetal Alchemist ===
In July 2001, Arakawa published the first chapter of Fullmetal Alchemist in Monthly Shōnen Gangan. The series spanned 108 chapters, with the last one published in July 2010, and the series was collected in twenty-seven volumes. The series won the 49th Shogakukan Manga Award in the shōnen category in 2004.

Fullmetal Alchemist has been adapted into two anime series by Bones. When they were creating the first, Arakawa assisted them in its early development. However, she was not involved in the making of the script, so the anime has a different ending from the manga, which she developed further.

When the second anime adaptation was reaching its ending, Arakawa showed director Yasuhiro Irie her plans for the manga's ending, making both end in near dates.

=== Other works ===
Arakawa has published more works, including Raiden-18, Sōten no Kōmori (also known as Bat in Blue Sky), and Hero Tales. Arakawa has collaborated with the creation of Hero Tales with Studio Flag under the name of Huang Jin Zhou. In the anime adaptation of the series, Arakawa was responsible for the character designs. She has also drawn the cover from the Japanese edition of the novel The Demon's Lexicon authored by Sarah Rees Brennan.

In April 2011, Arakawa began a series called Silver Spoon in Shogakukan's Weekly Shōnen Sunday. Rather than writing another fantasy series like Fullmetal Alchemist, Arakawa wanted to challenge herself by trying a more realistic story with Silver Spoon. It quickly rose among Shogakukan's best-selling titles and an anime series by A-1 Pictures began airing in July 2013. Also in July 2013 she began her manga adaptation of Yoshiki Tanaka's The Heroic Legend of Arslan series of novels in Kodansha's Bessatsu Shōnen Magazine.

Arakawa started the manga series Daemons of the Shadow Realm in Monthly Shōnen Gangan on December 10, 2021. In 2022, an anime adaptation of Arakawa's autobiographical manga Hyakushō Kizoku was announced.

== Personal life ==
Arakawa is married and has three children. She gave birth to a daughter in 2007 and had her third child in January 2014.

Arakawa is a fan of the Star Wars and Indiana Jones franchises, and has described Darth Vader as "the greatest villain of all time".

== Influences ==
Arakawa has stated that Suihō Tagawa, the author of Norakuro, is the "root of [her] style as an artist". She also learned composition and drawing during her time as assistant of Hiroyuki Etō. She also cites Rumiko Takahashi, Shigeru Mizuki, and Kinnikuman by Yudetamago as influences and is a fan of Mike Mignola's work.

== Works ==
- Stray Dog (1999)
- Shanghai Yōmakikai (上海妖魔鬼怪; lit. 'Ghost Demons of Shanghai') (2000)
- Fullmetal Alchemist (鋼の錬金術師, Hagane no Renkinjutsushi; lit. 'Alchemist of Steel') (2001–2010)
- Raiden-18 (2005–2021)
- Sōten no Kōmori (蒼天の蝙蝠; lit. 'A Bat in Blue Sky') (2006)
- Hero Tales (獣神演武, Jūshin Enbu) (2006–2010)
- Hyakushō Kizoku (百姓貴族; lit. 'The Noble Farmer') (2006–present)
- Silver Spoon (銀の匙, Gin no Saji) (2011–2019)
- The Heroic Legend of Arslan (アルスラーン戦記, Arusurān Senki; lit. 'Arslan War Records') (2013–present)
- Daemons of the Shadow Realm (黄泉のツガイ, Yomi no Tsugai; lit. 'Pairs from the Underworld') (2021–present)
- Moonrise (ムーンライズ, Mūnraizu) (2025) (character design)

== Awards ==
- 1999: 9th 21st Century Enix Award for Stray Dog
- 2003: 49th Shogakukan Manga Award, Shōnen category for Fullmetal Alchemist
- 2011: 15th Tezuka Osamu Cultural Prize, "New Artist Prize" category.
- 2011: 42nd Seiun Award, "Best Science Fiction Comic" category for Fullmetal Alchemist
- 2012: 5th Manga Taishō Award for Silver Spoon
- 2012: 58th Shogakukan Manga Award, Shōnen category for Silver Spoon
