= Goblin Market =

1862 narrative poem by Christina Rossetti

- by Christina Rossetti
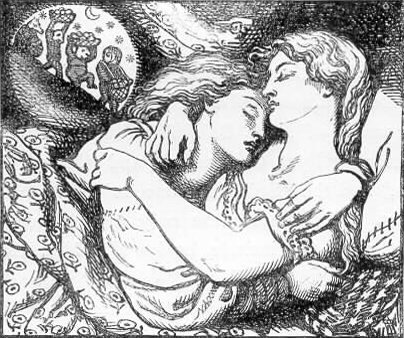
- Illustration for the cover of Christina Rossetti's Goblin Market and Other Poems (1862)
- Illustrator: Dante Gabriel Rossetti
- Form: Narrative poem
- Publication date: 1862

"Goblin Market" is an 1862 narrative poem by Christina Rossetti. It tells the story of sisters Laura and Lizzie, who are tempted with fruit by goblin merchants. In a letter to her publisher, Rossetti claimed that the poem, which is interpreted frequently as having features of remarkably sexual imagery, was not meant for children. However, in public Rossetti often stated that it was intended for children, and went on to write many children's poems. When it appeared in her first volume of poetry, Goblin Market and Other Poems, it was illustrated by her brother, the Pre-Raphaelite artist Dante Gabriel Rossetti.

== Plot ==
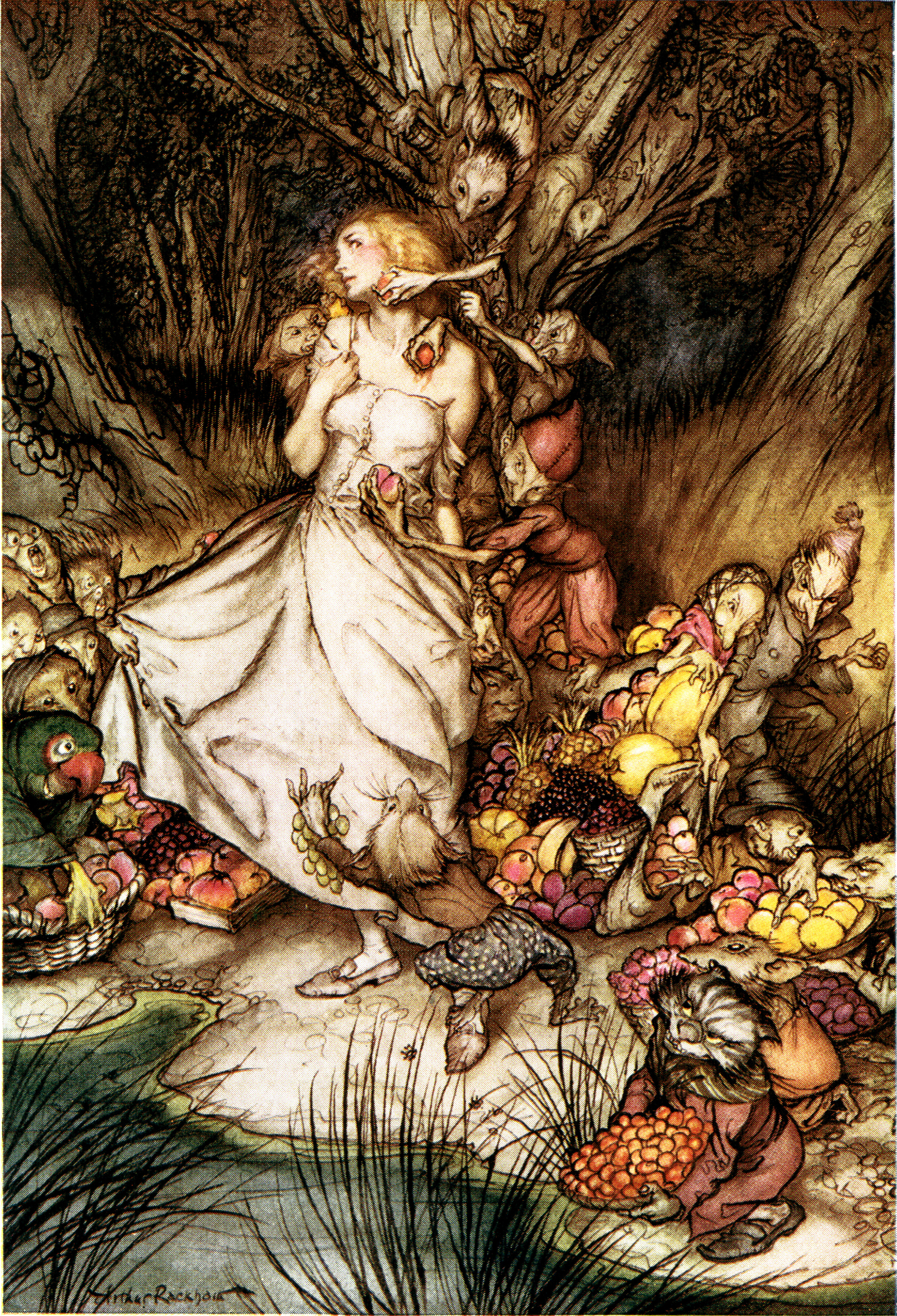
White and golden Lizzie stood

"Goblin Market" tells the adventures of two close sisters, Laura and Lizzie, with the river goblins.

Although the sisters seem to be quite young, they live by themselves in a house, and draw water every evening from a stream. As the poem begins, the sisters hear the calls of the goblin merchants selling their fantastic fruits in the twilight. On this evening, Laura, intrigued by their strangeness, lingers at the stream after her sister goes home. (Rossetti hints that the "goblin men" resemble animals with faces like wombats or cats, and with tails.) Longing for the goblin fruits but having no money, the impulsive Laura offers to pay a lock of her hair and "a tear more rare than pearl."

Laura gorges on the delicious fruit in a sort of bacchic frenzy. Once finished, she returns home in an ecstatic trance, carrying one of the seeds. At home, Laura tells her sister of the delights she indulged in, but Lizzie is "full of wise upbraidings," reminding Laura of Jeanie, another girl who partook of the goblin fruits, and then died at the beginning of winter after a long and pathetic decline. Strangely, no grass grows over Jeanie's grave. Laura dismisses her sister's worries, and plans to return the next night to get more fruits for herself and Lizzie. The sisters go to sleep in their shared bed.

The next day, as Laura and Lizzie go about their housework, Laura dreamily longs for the coming meeting with the goblins. That evening, however, as she listens at the stream, Laura discovers to her horror that, although her sister still hears the goblins' chants and cries, she cannot.

Unable to buy more of the forbidden fruit, Laura sickens and pines for it. As winter approaches, she withers and ages unnaturally, too weak to do her chores. One day she remembers the saved seed and plants it, but nothing grows.

Months pass, and Lizzie realises that Laura is wasting to death. Lizzie resolves to buy some of the goblin fruit for Laura. Carrying a silver penny, Lizzie goes down to the brook and is greeted warmly by the goblins, who invite her to dine. But when the merchants realise that she has no intent to eat the fruit, and only intends to pay in silver, they attack, trying to feed her their fruits by force. Lizzie is drenched with the juice and pulp, but consumes none of it.

Lizzie escapes and runs home, but when the dying Laura eats the pulp and juice from her body, the taste repulses rather than satisfies her, and she undergoes a terrifying paroxysm.

By morning, however, Laura is fully restored to health. The last stanza attests that both Laura and Lizzie live to tell their children of the evils of the goblins' fruits, and the power of a bond between sisters.

== Interpretation ==
The poem has inspired disparate interpretations. James Antoniou wrote in his 2020 Canberra Times article that "while the sheer lusciousness of the goblins' 'sugar-baited words' undercuts the moral [of restraint and sisterly love], the strange contradictions of the story itself repel any easy allegorical readings."

Critics in the late 1970s viewed the poem as an expression of Rossetti's feminist and homosexual politics. Some critics suggest the poem is about feminine sexuality and its relation to Victorian social mores. In addition to its clear allusions to Adam and Eve, forbidden fruit, and temptation, there is much in the poem that seems overtly sexual, such as when Lizzie, going to buy fruit from the goblins, considers her dead friend Jeanie, "Who should have been a bride; / But who for joys brides hope to have / Fell sick and died", and lines like, "She sucked their fruit globes fair or red"; and "Lizzie uttered not a word; / Would not open lip from lip / Lest they should cram a mouthful in; / But laughed in heart to feel the drip / Of juice that syruped all her face, / And lodged in dimples of her chin, / And streaked her neck which quaked like curd."

The poem's attitude toward this temptation seems ambiguous, since the happy ending offers the possibility of redemption for Laura, while typical Victorian portrayals of the "fallen woman" ended in the fallen woman's death. Rossetti volunteered at Highgate Penitentiary for fallen women shortly after composing Goblin Market in the spring of 1859.

Some critics believe that some feminist interpretations of the work ignore an antisemitic aspect of the poem. The critic Cynthia Scheinberg believes the Goblins to be "Hebraic", anti-semitic and anti-Judaic characters that the tested Christian sisters Laura and Lizzie must face in order to transition into wholesome and complete young women.

Other critics focus not on gender but on the Victorian consciousness of a capitalist critique of the growing Victorian economic market, whether in relation to sisters' Lizzie and Laura's interaction with the market as gendered beings, the agricultural market, or in the rapid increase in advertising the "Market". When "Goblin Market" was released in April 1859, most Victorians weren't able to purchase fresh fruit, a historical note of importance when reading the poem for Victorian agriculture and tone.

According to Antony Harrison of North Carolina State University, Jerome McGann reads the poem as a criticism of Victorian marriage markets and conveys "the need for an alternative social order". For Sandra Gilbert, the fruit represents Victorian women's exclusion from the world of art. Other scholars – most notably Herbert Tucker – view the poem as a critique on the rise of advertising in pre-capitalist England, with the goblins utilising clever marketing tactics to seduce. Laura. J. Hartman, among others, has pointed out the parallels between Laura's experience and the experience of drug addiction. Another interpretation has observed an image of Jesus Christ in Lizzie when she says: "Eat me, drink me, love me." This is imagery used to identify Christ's sacrifice in communion services.

The poem uses an irregular rhyme scheme, often using couplets or ABAB rhymes, but also repeating some rhymes many times in succession, or allowing long gaps between a word and its partner. The metre is also irregular, typically (though not always) keeping three or four stresses, in varying feet, per line. The lines below show the varied stress patterns, as well as an interior rhyme (grey/decay) picked up by the end-rhyme with "away". The initial line quoted here, "bright", rhymes with "night" a full seven lines earlier.

But when the noon waxed bright
Her hair grew thin and grey;
She dwindled, as the fair full moon doth turn
To swift decay, and burn
Her fire away.

== Notable editions ==
- Christina Rossetti. Goblin Market and Other Poems. 1st Ed. London: Macmillan, 1862. (Binding, frontis and title page by D.G. Rossetti).
- Christina Rossetti. Goblin Market. London: Macmillan, 1893. (Illustrator: Laurence Housman)
- Christina Rossetti. Goblin Market, Prince's Progress and Other Poems. London: Oxford UP, 1913.
- Christina Rossetti. Goblin Market. Philadelphia: J. B. Lippincott Co. Printed in Great Britain by R. & R. Clark, Limited, Edinburgh, 1933. (Illustrator: Arthur Rackham)
- Christina Rossetti. Goblin Market. London: George G. Harrap, 1933. (Illustrator: Arthur Rackham)
- Christina Rossetti. Goblin Market. New York: E.P. Dutton, 1970. (Illustrator: Ellen Raskin)
- Christina Rossetti. Goblin Market. Playboy September 1973: 115-119. (Illustrator: Kinuko Y. Craft) -- also includes nude photography
- Christina Rossetti. Goblin Market. London: Victor Gollancz, 1980. (Illustrator: Martin Ware)
- Christina Rossetti. Goblin Market. Pathways to Fantasy July 1984: 9-18.

== Adaptations ==
- The English composer Emanuel Abraham Aguilar, brother of the novelist Grace Aguilar, collaborated with Rossetti on a choral cantata, Goblin Market, in 1880. This was the only nineteenth century musical setting of the poem, as Rossetti granted Aguilar an exclusive. It was lightly adapted (with the author's approval) to remove sexual and erotic connotations, making it more suitable for school performances.
- Italian composer Vittorio Ricci (1859–1925) was the first to come up with a setting once Aguilar's exclusive rights had expired. The cantata Der Gnomen Markt was published in 1901 with an English libretto adapted by M.C. Gillington, and a German translation.
- Ruth Gipps composed the cantata Goblin Market in 1954, the first female composer to produce a setting. It is sung by two soprano soloists (solo 1 Laura, solo 2 Lizzie) and female three-part chorus, accompanied by string orchestra or piano. Her careful adaptation anticipated feminist literary interpretations of the poem that emerged in the 1970s.
- A 70-minute stage musical version of the poem adapted by Peggy Harmon and Polly Pen was performed at the Vineyard Theater in New York City in 1985.
- American composer Aaron Jay Kernis set the poem in 1995 for narrator and chamber ensemble, without alterations or abridgement, and with each syllable precisely notated. It is "probably the most detailed and sustained interpretation of the poem's irregular meter to date". It has been recorded.
- A 75-minute chamber opera Goblin Market was presented by Youth Music Theatre UK at George Square Theatre, Edinburgh Fringe Festival in 2005. The adaptation and libretto was by Kath Burlinson and the score by Conor Mitchell.
- New Zealand circus company The Dust Palace adapted the story into a performance piece titled The Goblin Market, incorporating various aerial and adagio circus arts. The production toured in Canada in 2016 and New Zealand in 2019.
- In July 2020, BBC Radio 4 broadcast a reading of the poem interwoven with testimony from sisters whose lives had been caught up in the cycle of addiction.

== Popular culture references ==
- Goblin Market was the title of a swing instrumental written by Spud Murphy for the Joe Haymes orchestra, recorded in 1934.
- Helen McCloy wrote a mystery novel called "The Goblin Market" which quotes the poem.
- Angela Carter's short story "The Erl-King", from her 1979 collection The Bloody Chamber, describes a young woman's perilous addiction to her unearthly lover's embrace. She returns to him again and again, "thirsty, cankered, goblin-ridden"—a quote from line 484 of the poem.
- Grant Morrison in the 1990s version of Dan Dare quotes from "Goblin Market"—"'We must not look at goblin men, / We must not buy their fruits: / Who knows upon what soil they fed / Their hungry thirsty roots?'"—as a clue to the Mekon's intentions.
- Jeanette Winterson's 1985 novel Oranges Are Not the Only Fruit: Elsie reads Jeanette Goblin Market when she is in hospital; scholar LaDelle Davenport has argued this insinuates her awareness of Jeanette's being a lesbian.
- Doctor Who "Midnight" (first aired 14 June 2008, episode no. 196): Dee Dee, a graduate assistant accompanying a professor, quotes the same lines, suggesting that the alien who has possessed a passenger on their shuttle cruiser is like a goblin (a dangerous and mysterious entity). The Doctor explains the literary reference.
- Sarah Rees Brennan's 2009 novel The Demon's Lexicon features the Market as a Gypsy-like society of people who barter and trade magical artifices and oppose the power hungry Magicians and the Demons they have evoked to the earthly plane.
- Rena Rossner identifies the Goblin Market as a source of inspiration for her 2018 novel The Sisters of the Winter Wood in the Afterword.
- Poirot: Cat Among the Pigeons (TV Episode 2008) Eileen Rich is seen reading the poem to her students and later in the episode Poirot comments on her reading of the poem.
- Seanan McGuire's 2019 novella In an Absent Dream explores the Goblin Market as its own alternate world, and the protagonist travels back and forth between that world and her own (similar to this one).
- Heather O'Neill's 2022 novel When We Lost Our Heads draws on themes from the poem. The female protagonists both recite the poem in a poetry competition, and later see it as a representation of their relationship.
- Fallen London's 2026 story module The Goblin Poet written by Baudelaire Welch is a reference to Goblin Market, and is based widely on the works of Christina and Dante Rossetti.
