= The Prince's Progress and Other Poems =

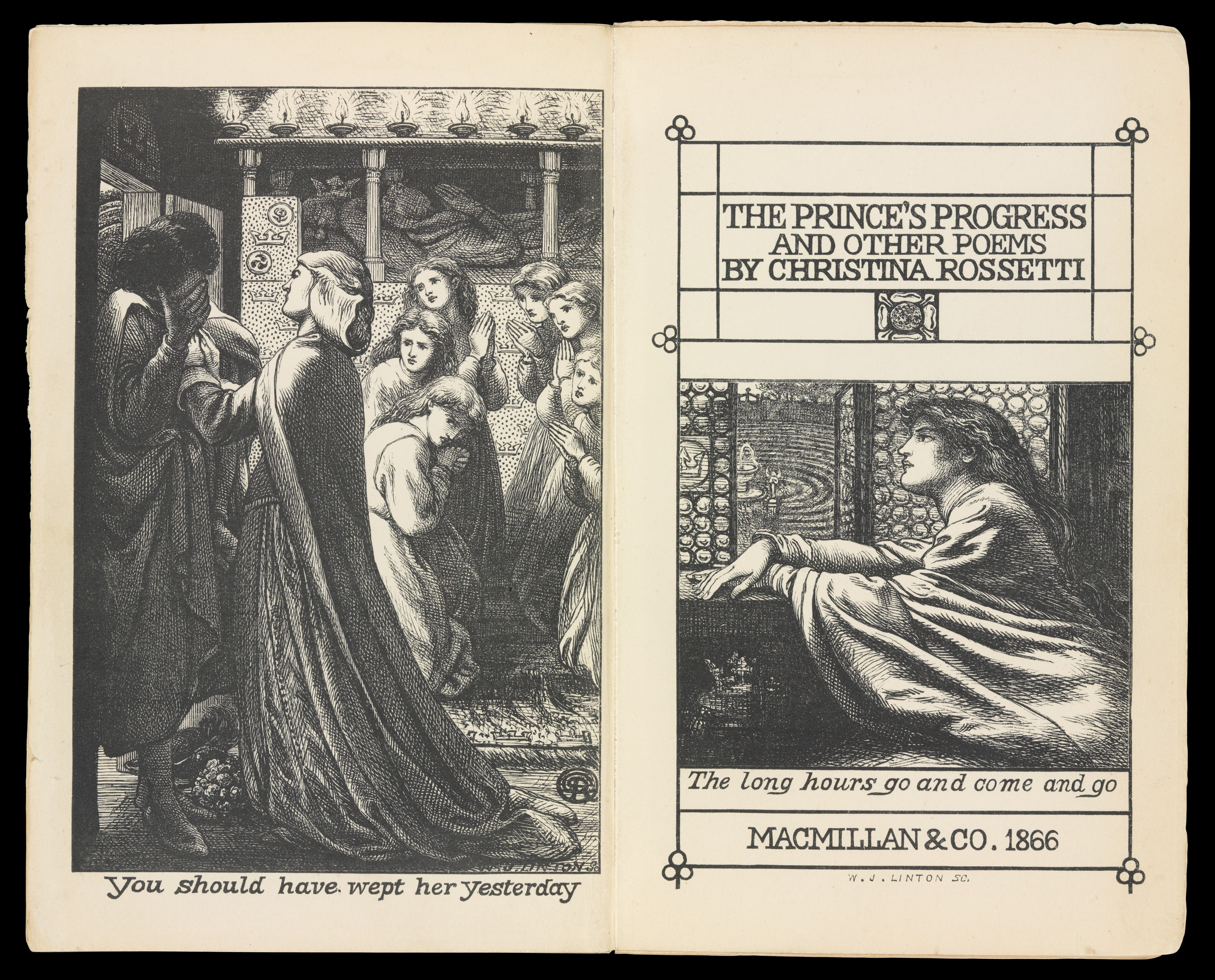
- Left: Frontispiece illustration depicting the grief-stricken prince after finding out his princess has died. Right: The princess stares longingly out a window, awaiting the return of her prince.
- Author: Christina Rossetti
- Illustrator: Dante Gabriel Rossetti
- Language: English
- Genre: Poetry
- Publisher: Macmillan and Co.
- Publication date: 1866
- Publication place: London, England, United Kingdom
- Media type: Hardback
- Pages: 216
- OCLC: 4254761
- Preceded by: Goblin Market and Other Poems

The Prince's Progress and Other Poems is Christina Rossetti's second volume of poetry, published by Macmillan and Co. in 1866. Christina's brother Dante Gabriel Rossetti designed the illustrations and bindings for the publication, just as he had for her first volume, Goblin Market and Other Poems. The Prince's Progress tells the story of a princess awaiting the return of her prince. After tarrying due to a series of temptations and self-indulgences, the prince returns only to find that the princess has died. Dante Gabriel Rossetti's frontispiece illustration depicts the grief-stricken prince upon hearing the news of his princess's death; the title illustration depicts the princess staring longingly out the window as she waits for her prince to return. The 1866 edition contains 46 poems in addition to "The Prince's Progress."

Dante Gabriel Rossetti disagreed with the gaudy ornamentation of many Victorian books, and thus attempted to refine the heavily ornamented book with his own bindings. In this publication, he employs a combination of minimalist motifs and contemporary technology, seen specifically in the gold stamping. The hand and machine work of this design ensured the perpetuation of Rossetti's aesthetic through wider accessibility.

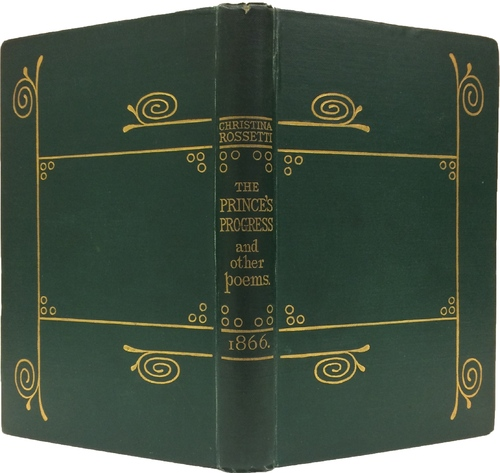
Gold stamped 'nailheads' on green cloth.

The gold design makes reference to clasps and nailheads on medieval books, and it is repeated on both the cover and back of the book. In conjunction with the wood-engraved illustrations, this binding has an integrated role in the art of the book as a whole. In addition to the medieval allusion, the organic motifs reflect the theme of growth and change within the text. In this way, the binding becomes a part of the narrative.

== Poems ==
The poems in the book include the following:

- "The Prince's Progress"
- "Maiden-Song"
- "Jessie Cameron"
- "Spring Quiet"
- "The Poor Ghost"
- "A Portrait"
- "Dream-Love"
- "Twice"
- "Songs in a Cornfield"
- "A Year's Windfalls"
- "The Queen of Hearts"
- "One Day"
- "A Bird's-Eye View"
- "Light Love"
- "A Dream"
- "A Ring Posy"
- "Beauty Is Vain"
- "Lady Maggie"
- "What Would I Give?"
- "The Bourne"
- "Summer"
- "Autumn"
- "The Ghost's Petition"
- "Memory"
- "A Royal Princess"
- "Shall I Forget?"
- "Vanity of Vanities"
- "L. E. L."
- "Life and Death"
- "Bird or Beast?"
- "Eve"
- "Grown and Flown"
- "A Farm Walk"
- "Somewhere or Other"
- "A Chill"
- "Child's Talk in April"
- "Gone for Ever"
- "Under the Rose"
- Devotional Pieces:
  - "Despised and Rejected"
  - "Long Barren"
  - "If Only"
  - "Dost Thou Not Care?"
  - "Weary in Well-Doing"
  - "Martyrs' Song"
  - "After This the Judgement"
  - "Good Friday"
  - "The Lowest Place"
