= A Pageant and Other Poems =

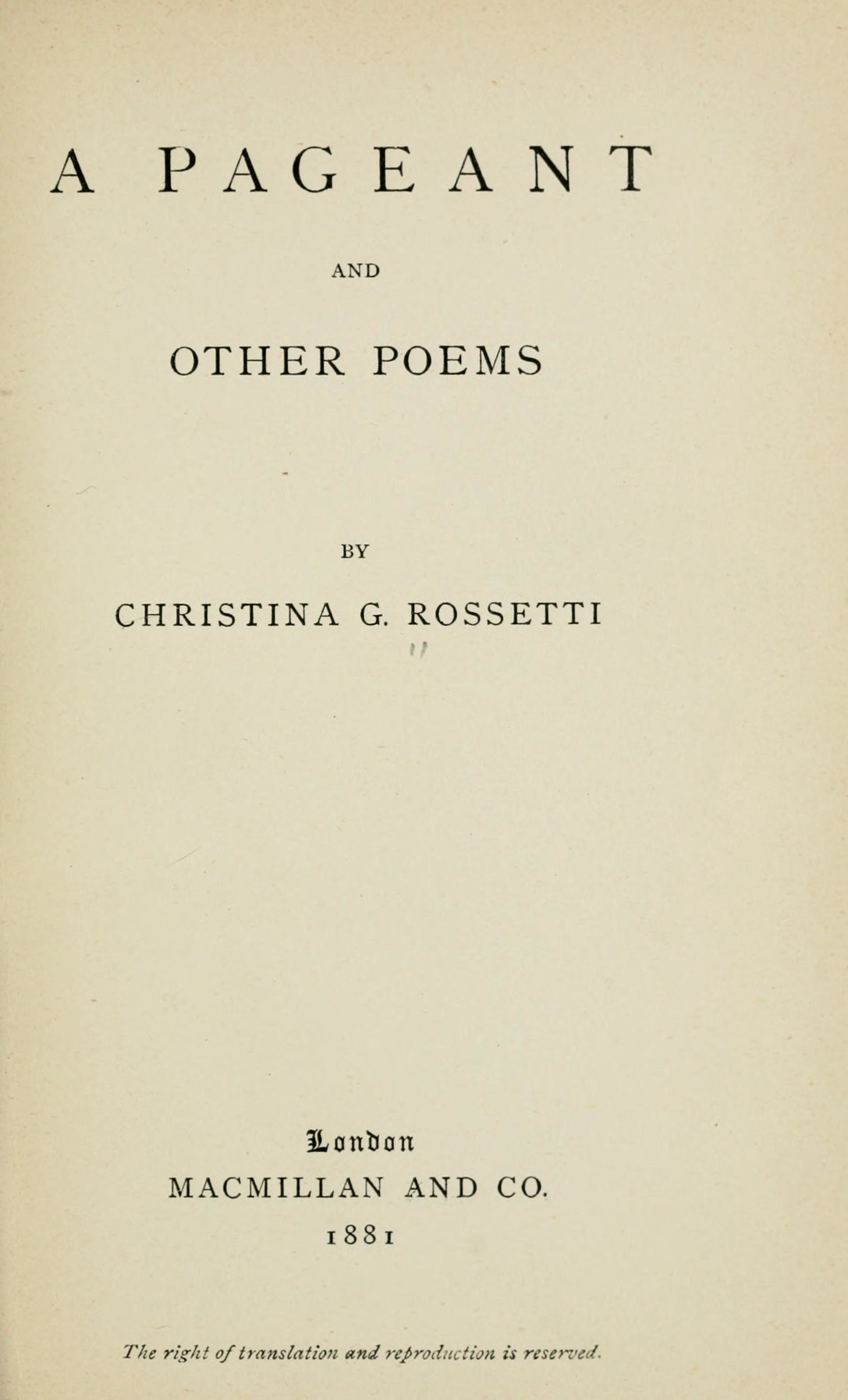
- Title page for A Pageant and Other Poems (1881)
- Author: Christina Rossetti
- Language: English
- Publication date: 1881
- Publication place: United Kingdom
- Media type: Print

A Pageant and Other Poems is Christina Rossetti's fourth collection of poetry. It was published in 1881 by Alexander Macmillan; the publisher agreed to publish it without having read the collection, based on the reception of Rossetti's previous poetry.
