= Team Human =

2012 young adult novel by Justine Larbalestier and Sarah Rees Brennan

- First edition (Australian)
- Author: Justine Larbalestier and Sarah Rees Brennan
- Language: English
- Publisher: Allen & Unwin (AUS); Harper Teen (US)
- Publication date: July 2012
- Publication place: United States, Canada, Australia, New Zealand
- Media type: Print (Hardback), Audiobook
- Pages: 352
- ISBN: 9780062089649

Team Human is a young adult novel co-written by Justine Larbalestier and Sarah Rees Brennan. It was published in 2012 by Allen and Unwin in Australia and by Harper Teen, a division of HarperCollins in the US. The book came out of the authors' shared love of vampire stories, and is both parody and celebration of the genre. The book is dedicated to a long list of authors who have written in the genre, including Stephen King, Stephenie Meyer, Anne Rice, Bram Stoker, and Larbalestier's husband Scott Westerfeld.

== Plot ==
Team Human is set in the town of New Whitby, Maine, the origin of America's compact with vampires and a place that sees them living side-by-side in relative harmony. When a century-old vampire joins their high school class, Mel is horrified when her best friend Cathy falls for him. Afraid that Cathy might be considering becoming a vampire herself, Mel starts on a quest to show Cathy how dangerous the undead really are, which means braving the vampire district and solving a mystery. As the book's tagline states, "friends don't let friends date vampires."

== Development ==
Larbalestier and Brennan met four years before the book was published, through mutual friends in a New York cafe. They became fast friends, and chatted online frequently, since Brennan resides in Ireland and Larbalestier splits her time between New York and Australia. Inspiration for the book struck after they talked about the film New Moon. They wrote the characters with vampire tropes in mind, describing the vampire love interest Francis as "if Edward Cullen and Ashley from Gone with the Wind had a baby." Despite the satire, they describe the book as being at its heart one about friendship, the real message being "friends don't let friends go."

== Reception ==
Critical reception for Team Human has been positive. Publishers Weekly praised the authors' ability to poke affectionate fun at vampire tropes while creating a memorable story, calling it "part Nancy Drew with vampires, part thoughtful and provocative story about assumptions." They named it in their list of Best Summer Books of 2012. Kirkus gave the book a starred review and named it as a Best of 2012, noting that it's perfect for both lovers and loathers of the vampire genre.
