= Christina Rossetti =

English poet (1830–1894)

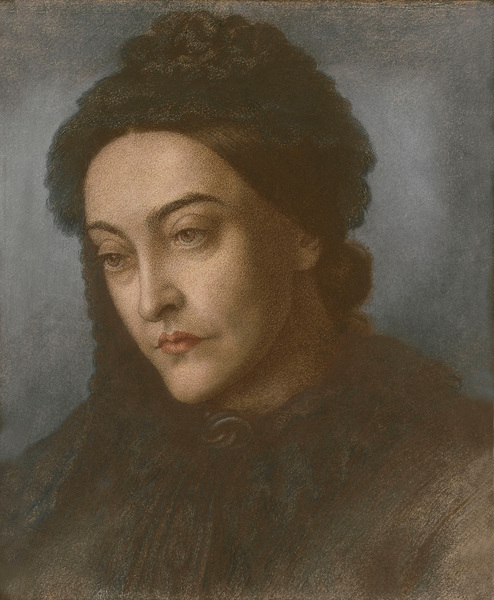
- Portrait by her brother, Dante Gabriel Rossetti, 1877.
- Born: Christina Georgina Rossetti; 5 December 1830; London, England
- Died: 29 December 1894 (aged 64); London, England
- Occupation: Poet
- Parents: Gabriele Rossetti; Frances Polidori
- Relatives: Dante Gabriel Rossetti (brother); Maria Francesca Rossetti (sister); William Michael Rossetti (brother); Gaetano Polidori (maternal grandfather); John William Polidori (maternal uncle)
- Writing career
- Notable works: Goblin Market; lyrical poems; hymns
- Movement: Pre-Raphaelite

Signature
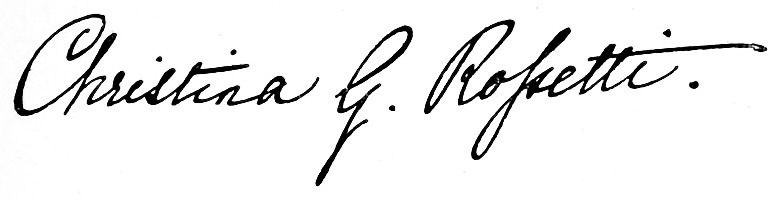

Christina Georgina Rossetti (5 December 1830 – 29 December 1894) was an English writer of romantic and devotional poems, including "Goblin Market" and "Remember".

She was the youngest sister of the artist and poet Dante Gabriel Rossetti and features in several of his paintings, including Ecce Ancilla Domini! (1850). Some of her early poetry, such as "Goblin Market", was influenced by the Pre-Raphaelite movement.

She also wrote the words of two Christmas carols well known in Britain: "In the Bleak Midwinter", later set to music by Gustav Holst, Katherine Kennicott Davis, and Harold Darke, and "Love Came Down at Christmas", also set to music by Darke and other composers. Her work has influenced the writings of Ford Madox Ford, Virginia Woolf, Gerard Manley Hopkins, Elizabeth Jennings, and Philip Larkin.

Christina was affected throughout her life by ill-health and depression. She never married, despite receiving three offers, but devoted her life to her poetry and her religious faith.

== Early life ==
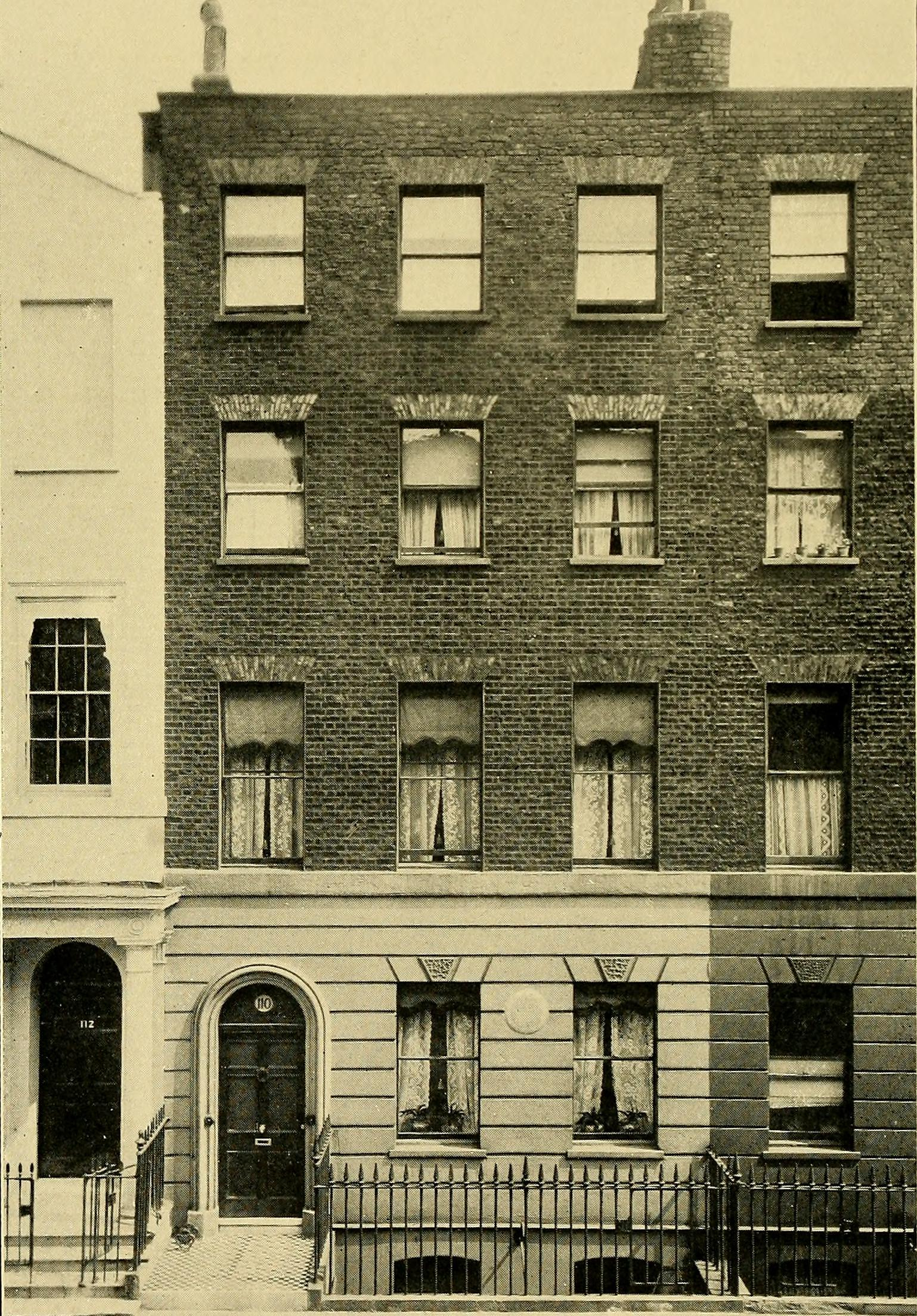
The birth place of Rossetti

Christina Rossetti was born on 5 December 1830 at 38 Charlotte Street (now 110 Hallam Street), London. Her father was Gabriele Rossetti, a poet and political exile from Vasto, Italy, and her mother was Frances Polidori, the sister of John William Polidori.

Christina was the youngest of four children: Maria Francesca was the eldest, born in 1827; then Gabriel Charles Dante (later known as Dante Gabriel) in 1828; and William Michael in 1829.

The children were brought up in the Protestant faith. Their mother was very devout, although their father, a lapsed Catholic, held unorthodox religious views. The family's often heated discussions over differing aspects of religion made a deep impression on the young Christina.

=== Education ===
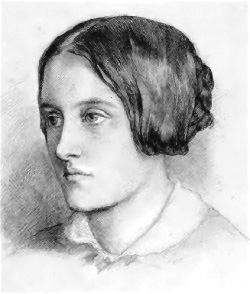
Portrait of Rossetti by her brother, Dante Gabriel Rossetti from 1848.

The Rossetti siblings enjoyed a close relationship, and together they produced a family magazine called the Hodge Podge. All four were interested in creating poetry, stories and illustrations. Christina was a precocious child, known for her fiery temper, who dictated her first story to her mother before she learnt to write. Though her brothers were educated at boarding school, Christina and her sister Maria were educated at home by their parents. Christina read a variety of religious works, and also classics, fairy tales and novels. She delighted in the works of Keats, Scott, Ann Radcliffe and Matthew Lewis. The household was a bohemian one, open to visiting Italian scholars, artists and revolutionaries. The influence of Dante Alighieri, Petrarch and other Italian writers filled the home and influenced Christina's later writing. The family home in Bloomsbury was within easy reach of Madame Tussauds, London Zoo and the newly opened Regent's Park, which Christina visited frequently. Unlike her parents, she felt at home in London and was seemingly happy during her early years.

=== Financial troubles ===
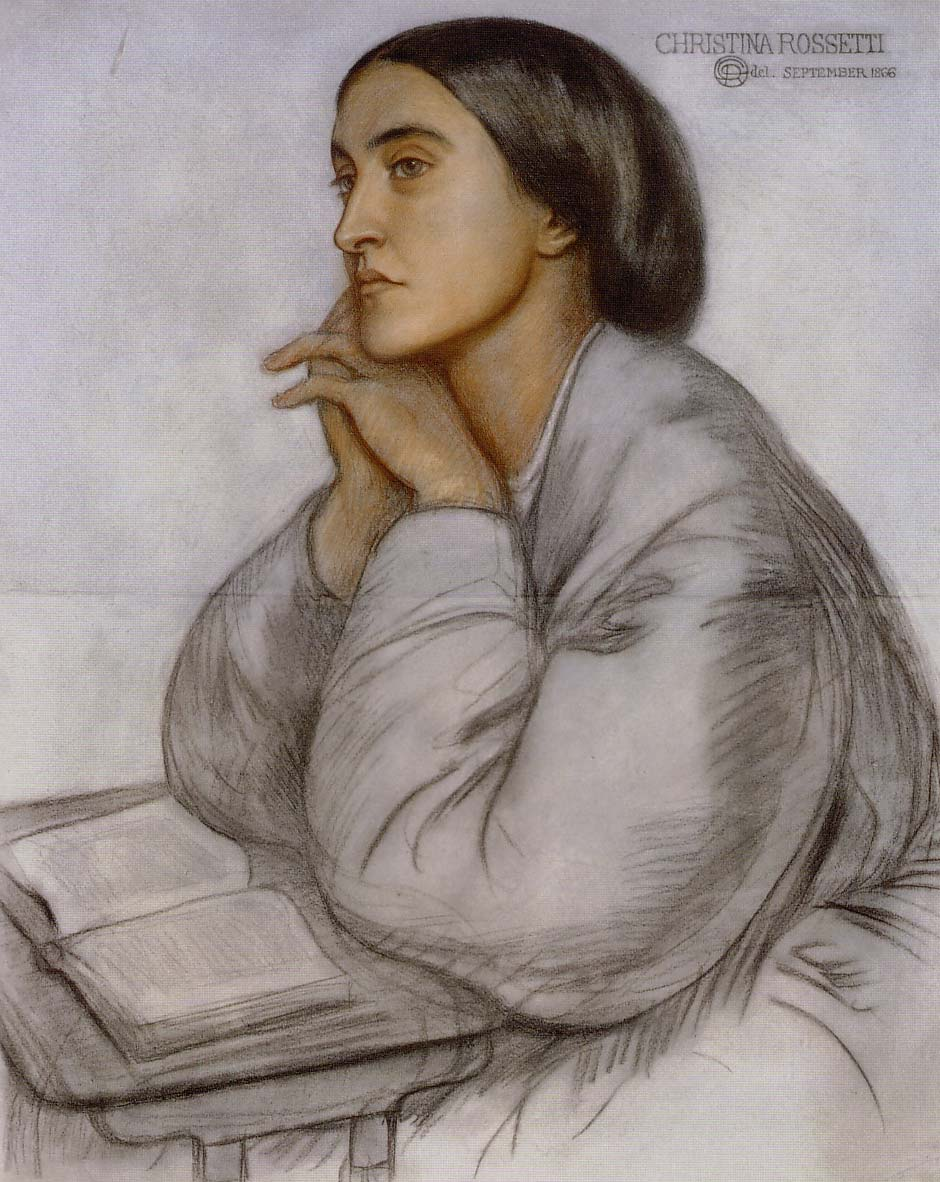
Christina Rossetti, by her brother Dante Gabriel Rossetti

In the 1840s, the Rossetti family, never wealthy, faced increasing financial troubles after a deterioration in Gabriele Rossetti's physical and mental health. In 1843, he was diagnosed with persistent bronchitis, possibly tuberculosis, and faced losing his sight. He gave up his teaching post at King's College, and though he lived another 11 years, he suffered from depression and was never physically well again. Christina's mother began teaching to support the family, and Maria became a live-in governess, a prospect that Christina dreaded. At this time, William Rossetti was working for the Excise Office, and Gabriel was at art school, leaving Christina increasingly isolated at home.

When she was 14 Christina suffered a nervous breakdown and left school. Bouts of depression and related illness followed. During this period she, her mother and her sister became absorbed in the Anglo-Catholic movement that had developed in the Church of England. Religious devotion came to play a major role in her life. Between 1842 and 1847, Christina underwent a change of personality, explained by her brother William as a combination of "ill health and an early blight to the affections," as well as a growing preoccupation with religious matters, describing her as "a fountain sealed."

=== Engagement to James Collinson ===
In her late teens, Christina became engaged to the painter James Collinson. He, like her brothers Gabriel and William, was a founding member of the Pre-Raphaelite Brotherhood, established in 1848. However, the Collinson family did not warm to Christina, and she ended the engagement in 1850 when Collinson reverted to Catholicism. This early disappointment marked Christina profoundly.

=== Modelling ===
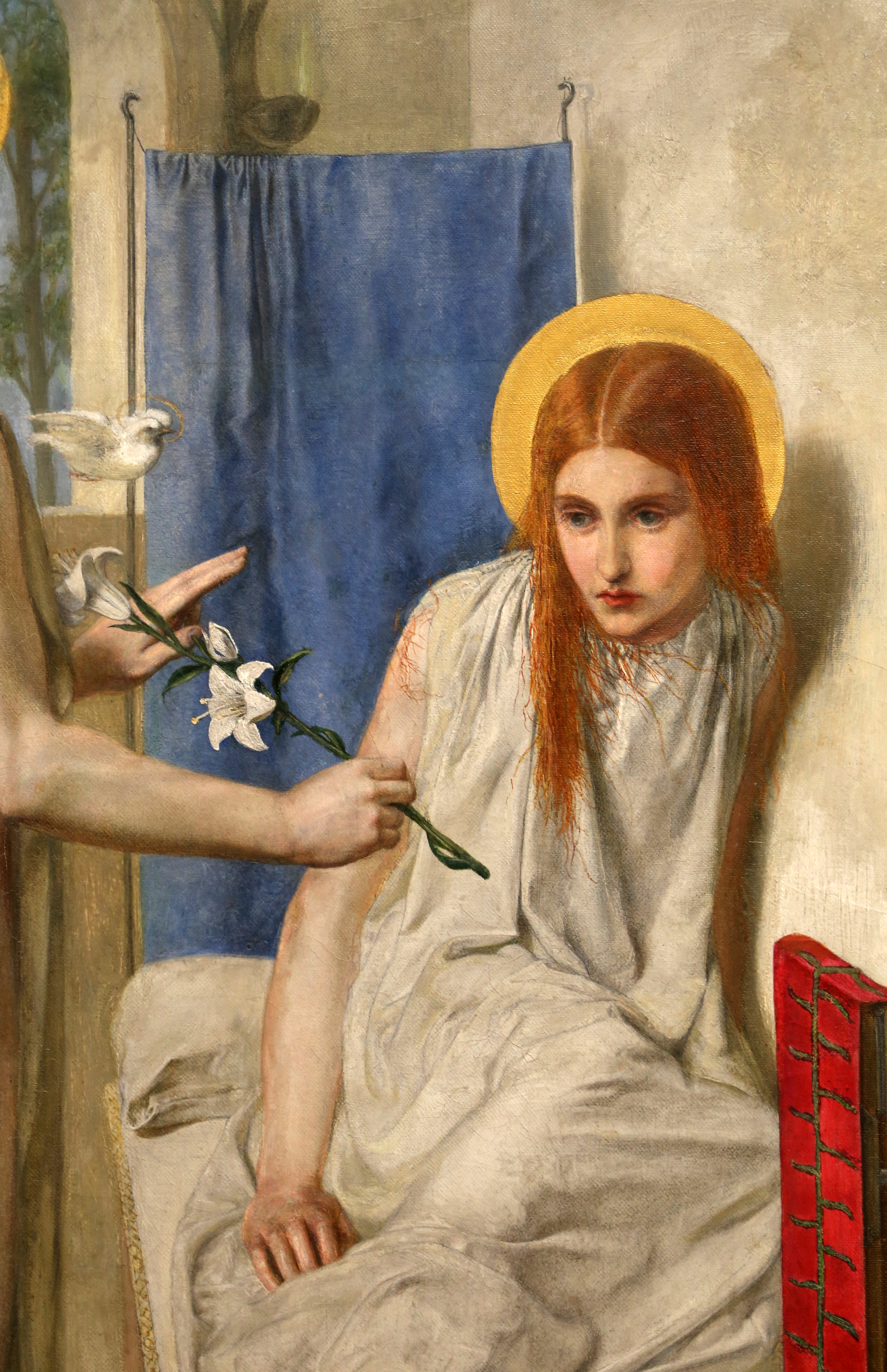
Detail from Ecce Ancilla Domini, by Dante Gabriel Rossetti

Christina sat for several of Dante Gabriel Rossetti's paintings. In 1848 she sat for the Virgin Mary in his first completed oil painting, The Girlhood of Mary Virgin, the first work he inscribed with the initials "PRB", for the Pre-Raphaelite Brotherhood. The following year Christina modelled for his depiction of the Annunciation, Ecce Ancilla Domini!

Christina was also an artist, attending the North London Drawing School in the early 1850s, and later producing her own drawings as guides for the illustrators of her poetry books.

== Poetry ==
Up Hill

Does the road wind up hill all the way?
Yes, to the very end.
Will the day's journey take the whole long day?
From morn to night, my friend.

But is there for the night a resting-place?
A roof for when the slow dark hours begin?
May not the darkness hide it from my face?
You cannot miss that inn.

Shall I meet other wayfarers at night?
Those who have gone before.
Then must I knock, or call when just in sight?
They will not keep you standing at that door.

Shall I find comfort, travel-sore and weak?
Of labour you shall find the sum.
Will there be beds for me and all who seek?
Yea, beds for all who come.

— By Christina Georgina Rossetti

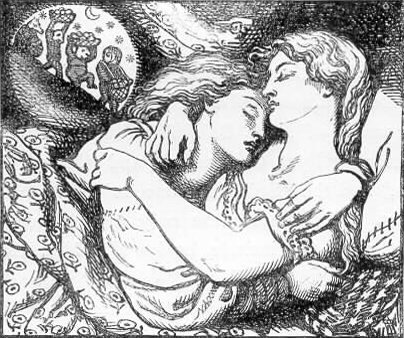
Frontispiece of Christina Rossetti's Goblin Market and Other Poems (1862), by her brother Dante Gabriel Rossetti

From 1842 onward, Christina began collecting and dating her poems. Most of these were written in imitation of her favourite poets. In 1847 she began experimenting with verse forms such as sonnets, hymns and ballads, while drawing on narratives from the Bible, folk tales and the lives of saints. Her early pieces often meditate on death and loss in the Romantic tradition.

In 1847, Christina's grandfather Gaetano Polidori published a small volume of her poetry, which was given out to family and friends. In 1848, two poems, "Death's Chill Between" and "Heart's Chill Between," were published in the Athenaeum magazine. She used the pseudonym "Ellen Alleyne" in the literary periodical The Germ, published by the Pre-Raphaelites from January to April 1850 and edited by her brother William. This marked the beginning of her public career.

During this time Christina once more became seriously ill with depression. In 1853 she helped her mother run a school in Fromefield, Frome, but the venture was not a success. A plaque marks the house. In 1854 they returned to London, where Gabriele Rossetti died.

Christina's more critical reflections on the artistic movement her brother had begun were expressed in an 1856 poem, "In the Artist's Studio". Here she reflects on seeing multiple paintings of the same model. For Christina, the artist's idealised vision of the model's character begins to overwhelm his work, until "every canvas means/the one same meaning". Dinah Roe, in her introduction to the Penguin Classics collection of Pre-Raphaelite poetry, argues that this critique of her brother and similar male artists is less about "the objectification of women" than about "the male artist's self-worship".

At this time, Christina received an offer of marriage from the painter John Brett, which she refused. Christina's 1860 poem "No, Thank You, John" may refer to this episode. Christina's biographer Violet Hunt states that Brett made a proposal of marriage to Christina and was rejected, adding that in 1858, Brett abandoned a portrait he had been painting of her.

=== Goblin Market ===
Portrait of Rossetti from the late 1800s.

Christina's first commercially printed collection, Goblin Market and Other Poems, was published under her own name by Macmillan & Co. in 1862, when she was 31. Christina worked as a volunteer in 1859–1870 at the London Diocesan Penitentiary in Highgate, a refuge for fallen women – some historians have suggested that Goblin Market may have been inspired by some of its inmates. Dante Gabriel Rossetti became his sister's collaborator and created a series of woodcut illustrations to the book, and in 1861 Gabriel sent a copy to the art critic John Ruskin. The response was disappointing: Ruskin acknowledged the poem's "beauty and power" but was severely critical of its "irregular measure."

After publication, Goblin Market was lauded by Gerard Manley Hopkins, Algernon Charles Swinburne and Alfred, Lord Tennyson. Gabriel named Christina as the natural successor to Elizabeth Barrett Browning, who had died the year before, in 1861. In an interview with William Sharp in The Atlantic Monthly (June 1895): Gabriel says: "She (Christina) is the finest woman-poet since Mrs. Browning, by a long way; and in artless art, if not in intellectual impulse, is greatly Mrs. Browning's superior." The title poem, one of Christina's best-known, is ostensibly about two sisters' misadventures with goblins, but critics have interpreted it in various ways, including as an allegory of temptation and salvation, a comment on Victorian gender roles and female agency, a work of erotic desire and social redemption, and an allegory of "addiction and recovery". There are parallels with Samuel Taylor Coleridge's The Rime of the Ancient Mariner in the religious themes of temptation, sin and redemption by vicarious suffering.

Christina had a wide circle of friends and correspondents, including the poet Swinburne. In 1883 Swinburne dedicated A Century of Roundels to Christina, and she adopted his roundel form in a number of poems, for instance in Wife to Husband.

Christina continued to write and publish for the rest of her life, mainly devotional work and poetry. In the years just before her death, she wrote The Face of the Deep (1892), a book of devotional prose, and in 1893 she oversaw an enlarged edition of Sing-Song, which had originally been published in 1872.

=== Engagement to Charles Cayley ===
Between 1864 and 1866, Christina became romantically involved with the poet and translator Charles Cayley, who was also a family friend. Their relationship was affectionate, but the passionately devout Christina ultimately found herself unable to marry the agnostic Cayley.

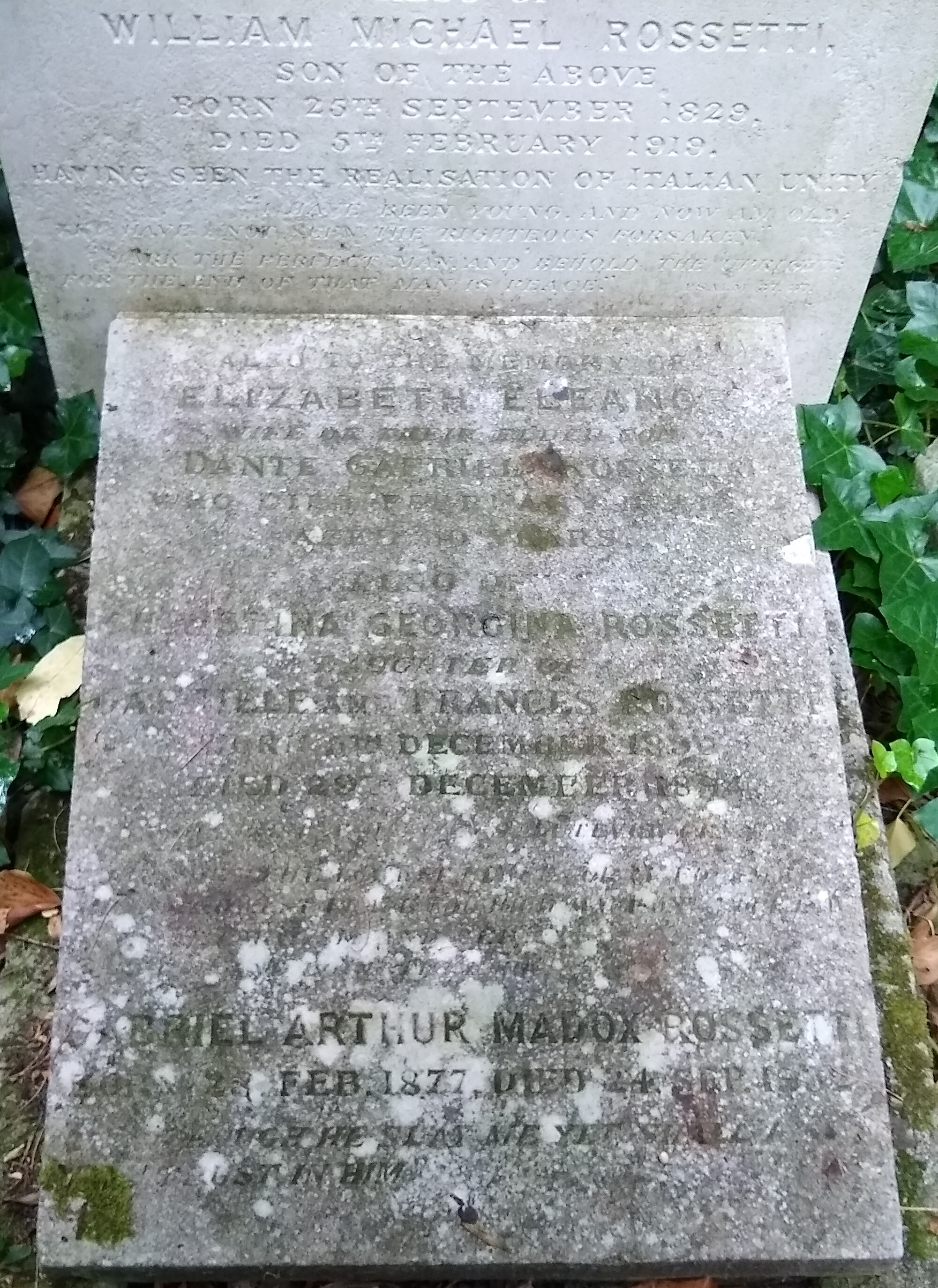
Grave of Christina Rossetti in Highgate Cemetery (West side)

== Later life ==
Song
When I am dead, my dearest,
Sing no sad songs for me;
Plant thou no roses at my head,
Nor shady cypress tree:
Be the green grass above me
With showers and dewdrops wet:
And if thou wilt, remember,
And if thou wilt, forget.

I shall not see the shadows,
I shall not feel the rain;
I shall not hear the nightingale
Sing on as if in pain:
And dreaming through the twilight
That doth not rise nor set,
Haply I may remember,
And haply may forget.

— 1862

In her later decades Christina suffered from a type of hyperthyroidism – Graves' disease – diagnosed in 1872, suffering a near-fatal attack in the early 1870s. In 1893 she developed breast cancer. The tumour was removed, but there was a recurrence in September 1893. She died of cancer on 29 December 1894 and was buried on 2 January 1895 in the family grave on the west side of Highgate Cemetery, which had been opened in October 1869 so that Gabriel could retrieve a volume of poems he had buried with his wife, Elizabeth Siddal. There Christina joined her father, mother and Elizabeth. Her brother William was also buried there in 1919, as were the ashes of four subsequent family members.

There is a stone tablet on the façade of 30 Torrington Square, Bloomsbury, marking Christina's final home, where she died.

=== Character ===
By nature a passionate, rebellious individual, Christina was fractious as a child, once cutting herself with a pair of scissors in response to a scolding by her mother, but later learnt to curb her temper and to cultivate a 'calm and sedate' appearance. This appearance of sobriety and purity was emphasised by Gabriel's depiction of her as the Virgin Mary, although Christina had a lively sense of humour, evidenced by her letters and her poetry for children.

Religion was a dominant influence in Christina's life, but she took an interest in current affairs and politics. She was ambivalent about women's suffrage, but many have found feminist themes in her work. She opposed slavery in the United States, cruelty to animals in prevalent vivisection, and the exploitation of girls in prostitution.

Many of Christina's letters, diary entries and papers were destroyed after her death by her brother William, who undertook the task of protecting her legacy and her reputation.

== Recognition ==
Christina Rossetti's popularity in her lifetime did not approach that of her contemporary Elizabeth Barrett Browning, but her standing remained strong after her death. Her popularity faded in the early 20th century in the wake of Modernism, but scholars began to explore Freudian themes in her work, such as religious and sexual repression, reaching for personal, biographical interpretations of her poetry.

Feminists held her as a symbol of constrained female genius and a leader among 19th-century poets. Her writings strongly influenced writers such as Ford Madox Ford, Virginia Woolf, Gerard Manley Hopkins, Elizabeth Jennings, and Philip Larkin. The critic Basil de Sélincourt called her "all but our greatest woman poet... incomparably our greatest craftswoman... probably in the first twelve of the masters of English verse."

The year stood at its equinox,
And bluff the North was blowing.
A bleat of lambs came from the flocks,
Green hardy things were growing.
I met a maid with shining locks,
Where milky kine were lowing.

She wore a kerchief on her neck
Her bare arm showed its dimple.
Her apron spread without a speck
Her air was frank and simple.

— From "The Milking-Maid" poem by Christina Georgina Rossetti

Christina's Christmas poem "In the Bleak Midwinter" became widely known in the English-speaking world after her death, when set as a Christmas carol by Gustav Holst and later by Harold Darke. Her poem "Love Came Down at Christmas" (1885) has also been widely arranged as a carol.

British composers receptive to Christina Rossetti's verse included Alexander Mackenzie (Three Songs, Op. 17, 1878), Frederick Cowen, Samuel Coleridge-Taylor (Six Sorrow Songs, Op. 57, 1904), Hubert Parry, Hope Squire, Charles Villiers Stanford, and Jack Gibbons (sixteen song settings). In 1918, John Ireland set eight poems from her Sing-Song: A Nursery Rhyme Book to music in his song cycle Mother and Child. The first verse of Yoko Ono's song "Who Has Seen the Wind?" (1970) was taken from her homonymous poem.

The poem "Song" was an inspiration for Bear McCreary's composition When I Am Dead, published in 2015. Two of Christina's poems, "Where Sunless Rivers Weep" and "Weeping Willow", were set to music by Barbara Arens in her All Beautiful & Splendid Things: 12 + 1 Piano Songs on Poems by Women (2017, Editions Musica Ferrum). "Love is Like a Rose" was set to music by Constance Cochnower Virtue; "Love Me, I Love You," was set to music by Hanna Vollenhoven; and "Song of the Dawn" was set to music by Elise Fellows White. American composer David Conte set "Rest", "Echo", and "A Hope Carol" in his "Three Poems of Christina Rossetti".

In 2000, one of many Millennium projects across the country was a poetry stone placed in what had been the grounds of North Hill House in Frome. On one side is an excerpt from Christina's poem, "What Good Shall My Life Do Me": "Love lights the sun: love through the dark/Lights the moon's evanescent arc:/Same Love lights up the glow-worms spark." She wrote about her brief stay in Frome, which had "an abundance of green slopes and gentle declivities: no boldness or grandeur but plenty of peaceful beauty".

In 2011 Christina Rossetti was a subject of a Radio 4 programme, In Our Time.

The title of J. K. Rowling's novel, The Cuckoo's Calling (2013), is from a line in the poem, A Dirge. The complete poem is the epigraph to the novel.

Christina Rossetti is commemorated in the Church of England calendar on 27 April.

== Ancestry ==
Ancestors of Christina Rossetti

8. Giuseppe Rossetti
4. Nicola Rossetti
9. Teresa Bosco
2. Gabriele Rossetti
10. Pietro Pietrocola
5. Maria Francesca Pietrocola
11. Domenica Miscione
1. Christina Rossetti
12. Agostino Ansano Polidori
6. Gaetano Polidori
13. Teresa Cosci
3. Frances Polidori
14. John Pierce
7. Anna Maria Pierce
15. Mary Pierce

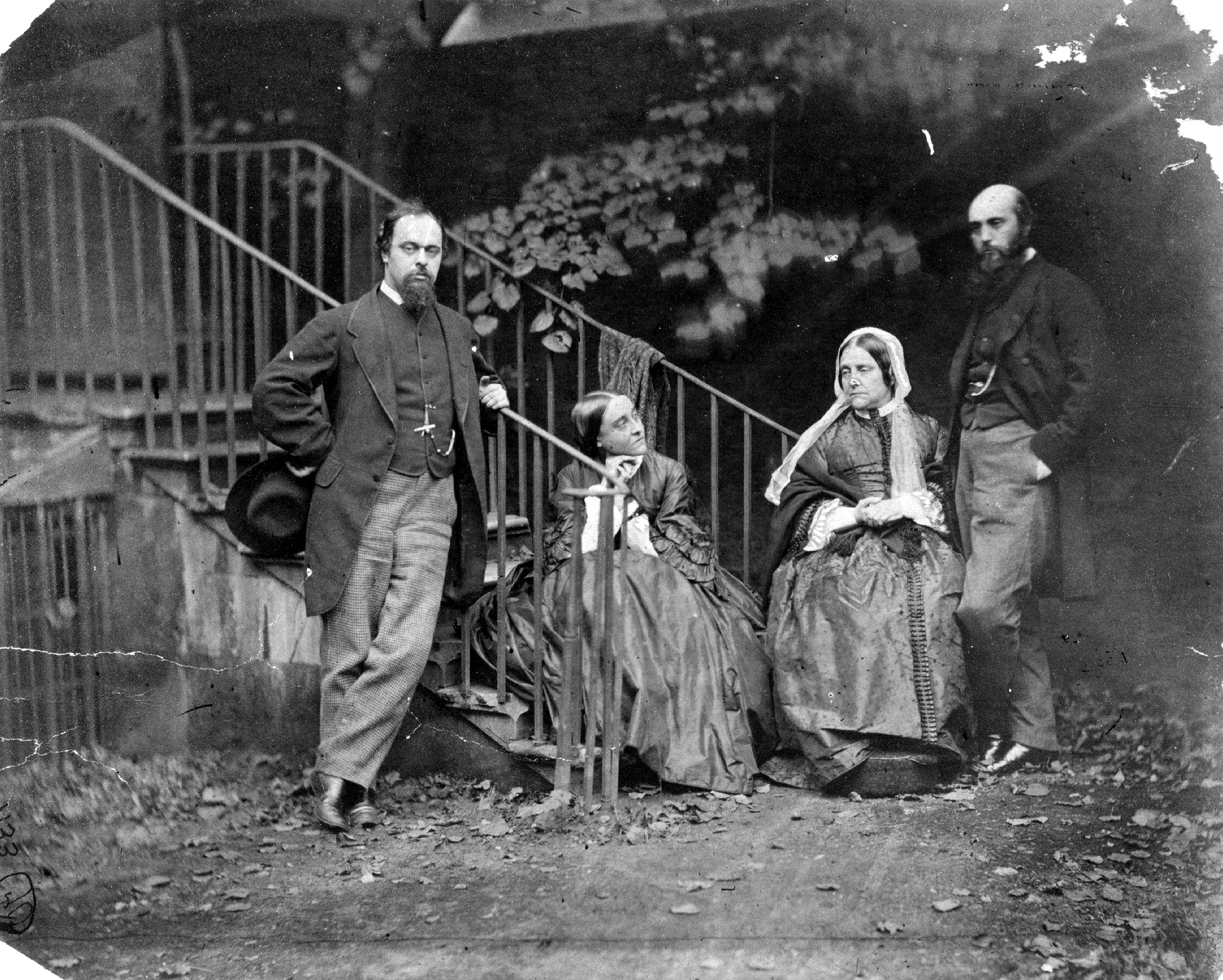
The Rossetti Family by Lewis Carroll (Charles Lutwidge Dodgson), 1863

== Publications ==
=== Poetry collections ===
- Verses, London: privately printed, 1847
- Goblin Market and Other Poems, London: Macmillan, 1862
  - 1876, author's revised edition
- The Prince's Progress and Other Poems, London: Macmillan, 1866
- Goblin Market, the Prince's Progress, and Other Poems. London: Macmillan. 1875.
  - Goblin Market, The Prince's Progress, and Other Poems. London: Macmillan, 1879
- Sing-Song: A Nursery Rhyme Book (1872, 1893)
- A Pageant and Other Poems (1881)
- Verses, London: Society for Promoting Christian Knowledge, 1893
- New Poems, London: Macmillan, 1896
- The Rossetti Birthday Book, London: privately printed, 1896
- The Poetical Works of Christina Georgina Rossetti, ed. William Michael Rossetti, London: Macmillan, 1904
- The Complete Poems of Christina Rossetti, ed. Rebecca W. Crump with publication notes, in three volumes, Baton Rouge: Louisiana State University Press, 1979–1985
- When I am Dead my Dearest

=== Fiction ===
- Commonplace and Other Stories, London: Ellis, 1870
- Speaking Likenesses, London: Macmillan, 1874

=== Non-fiction ===
- Called to Be Saints, London: Society for Promoting Christian Knowledge, 1881
- "Dante, an English Classic", Churchman's Shilling Magazine and Family Treasury 2 (1867), pp. 200–205
- "Dante: The Poet Illustrated out of the Poem". The Century (February 1884), pp. 566–573
- The Face of the Deep, London: Society for Promoting Christian Knowledge, 1893
- Seek and Find: A Double Series of Short Studies of the Benedicite, London: Society for Promoting Christian Knowledge, 1879
- Time Flies: A Reading Diary, London: Society for Promoting Christian Knowledge, 1885
