= Silver Spoon (manga) =

Japanese manga series

- First tankōbon volume cover, featuring Yuugo Hachiken

銀の匙 (Gin no Saji)
- Genre: Comedy; Coming-of-age; Slice of life
- Manga
- Written by: Hiromu Arakawa
- Published by: Shogakukan
- English publisher: NA: Yen Press; SG: Shogakukan Asia
- Imprint: Shōnen Sunday Comics
- Magazine: Weekly Shōnen Sunday
- Original run: April 6, 2011 – November 27, 2019
- Volumes: 15
- Anime television series
- Directed by: Tomohiko Itō (S1); Kotomi Deai (S2)
- Produced by: Shunsuke Saitō; Akitoshi Mori
- Written by: Taku Kishimoto
- Music by: Shūsei Murai
- Studio: A-1 Pictures
- Licensed by: AUS: Madman Entertainment (S1); BI: Anime Limited; NA: Aniplex of America
- Original network: Fuji TV (Noitamina)
- Original run: July 12, 2013 – March 28, 2014
- Episodes: 22
- Live-action film
- Directed by: Keisuke Yoshida
- Produced by: Akiko Ikuno; Tetsutaka Takeda; Hideki Hoshino
- Written by: Keisuke Yoshida; Ryō Takada
- Music by: Takefumi Haketa
- Studio: Toho
- Released: March 7, 2014
- Runtime: 111 minutes
- icon

Silver Spoon (Japanese: 銀の匙, Hepburn: Gin no Saji) is a Japanese manga series written and illustrated by Hiromu Arakawa. It was serialized in Shogakukan's shōnen manga magazine Weekly Shōnen Sunday from April 2011 to November 2019, with its chapters collected in 15 tankōbon volumes. The story is set in the fictional Ooezo Agricultural High School in Hokkaido, and depicts the daily life of Yuugo Hachiken, a high school student from Sapporo who enrolled at the agricultural high school to escape the demands of his strict father. However, he soon learns that life on an agricultural school is not as easy as he initially believed. Unlike his new classmates, he has no intention of following an agricultural career after graduating, although he envies them for already having set goals for their lives and the pursuit of their dreams.

An anime television series adaptation produced by A-1 Pictures aired for two seasons between July and September 2013 and January and March 2014 on Fuji TV's Noitamina block. A live-action film based on the manga produced by Toho was released in March 2014.

By February 2020, the manga had over 17 million copies in circulation. It won the fifth Manga Taishō in 2012, the 58th Shogakukan Manga Award in the shōnen category and the Japan Food Culture Contents Award, both in 2013.

== Plot ==
After failing to pass the entrance examinations for the high school he planned to attend, mild-mannered student Yuugo Hachiken moves away from his suburban home and enrolls at the rural Ooezo Agricultural High School (大蝦夷農業高等学校, Ōezo Nōgyō Kōtō Gakkō)—often abbreviated as Ezonō (エゾノー; 'Ezo Ag')—in the countryside. His relationship with his family is strained at the start of the story, which influences his decision to attend a school far from home.

He continues to worry about his future career over the course of the series. He soon finds himself slowly getting used to his new environment despite some initial struggles, and grows into an empathetic and compassionate individual as he struggles to understand the world of agriculture and how it affects the lives of his new friends.

== Characters ==
The main characters of the Silver Spoon series. From left to right: Tokiwa, Inada, Yoshino, Hachiken, Mikage, Nishikawa, Komaba, Aikawa, and Beppu.

Yuugo Hachiken (八軒 勇吾, Hachiken Yūgo)
Voiced by: Ryōhei Kimura
A city boy from Sapporo. After failing to pass the entrance exams for the high school he plans to attend, Yuugo decided to enroll at Ezo, expecting an easier academic workload. However, he is proven wrong. Due to his strict upbringing by his father, he is unable to refuse when someone needs his help. Despite complaining when he feels that people abuse his generosity, Yuugo quickly earns the friendship and respect of his peers. Yuugo joins the Equestrian Club alongside his classmate Aki and rises to the position of Vice President of the club. Yuugo is usually anxious about his future as, unlike his classmates who already have their goals in life, he is still wondering about what career he should choose. Much of Yuugo's animosity towards his family is a result of being compared to his more successful older brother, Shingo, and the seemingly uncaring hostility of his father. He has a crush on Aki, and they officially start dating after Aki got accepted into university.
Aki Mikage (御影 アキ, Mikage Aki)
Voiced by: Marie Miyake
Aki is a first-year student who is also a member of the Equestrian Club. As the only child of her family, she entered Ezo to study so that she would inherit her family business—a cow and horse farm specializing in raising Ban'ei race horses. She is wary of Yuugo at first. At first, is friendly and seems easygoing. However, she keeps her desires bottled up and pushes people away from her problems. She has poor grades, though, according to Yuugo, better than Keiji's. Later, her family experiences financial difficulties and is forced to sell all their horses. After this event, Aki confesses her true desires for the future, and—encouraged by Yuugo—expresses her will to work with horses professionally instead of inheriting the farm. She then starts studying (partly because of her poor grades) to enter college with Yuugo as her personal tutor. She slowly develops feelings for Yuugo, and they officially start dating after she gets accepted into university.
Mayumi Yoshino (吉野 まゆみ, Yoshino Mayumi)
Voiced by: Shiori Izawa
A classmate of Yuugo and a member of the Dairy Farming program. Her dream is to open her own cheese factory.
Ichiro Komaba (駒場 一郎, Komaba Ichirō)
Voiced by: Tooru Sakurai
One of Yuugo's close friends at Ezo and a skilled baseball player. Ichiro is Aki's childhood friend and neighbor which is initially a source of jealousy for Yuugo. Ichiro dreams of becoming a professional baseball player to earn money to improve his family's small dairy farm. However, his family goes bankrupt and their farm is sold to pay their debt. As a result, he is forced to quit Ezo and look for a job to make ends meet and support his mother and sisters.
Shinnosuke Aikawa (相川 進之介, Aikawa Shinnosuke)
Voiced by: Nobunaga Shimazaki
Another close friend of Yuugo, Shinnosuke aims to become a veterinarian after graduation. His goal, however, is complicated by his tendency to faint at the sight of blood. He is a member of the Holstein Club.
Tamako Inada (稲田 多摩子, Inada Tamako)
Voiced by: Ayahi Takagaki
A wealthy classmate of Yuugo whose family runs a huge industrial farm. She is usually an obese girl, but she hides under the extra fat a quite beautiful figure that reveals itself occasionally when she works too hard or goes on a quick diet. However, she has to regain her weight because she feels weak when she is thinner. Obsessed with money, Tamako's goal is to take over her family's farm (humorously depicted as a "hostile takeover" by her parents), and expand it and make it more profitable.
Keiji Tokiwa (常盤 恵次, Tokiwa Keiji)
Voiced by: Masayuki Shouji
A close friend of Yuugo who has a talent of getting himself in trouble due to his difficulty studying (which has humorously become Yuugo's means of gauging Aki's and even his dog Vice President's learning abilities) and his habit of jumping to conclusions, much to his friends' chagrin—even putting Yuugo and Mayumi in the hot seat once. His family owns a chicken farm.
Hajime Nishikawa (西川 一, Nishikawa Hajime)
Voiced by: Kengo Takanashi
A close friend of Yuugo who is a huge otaku. He is sensible and mature and often gives Yuugo good advice. He cares for his friends and is very intelligent, knowing a lot about the crops and their economic value, and technology. He hopes to attend a college or university in Tokyo, mainly because, as he claims, Tokyo is the land of otaku.
Ayame Minamikujō (南九条 あやめ, Minamikujō Ayame)
Voiced by: Sayuri Yahagi
An aristocratic girl to a vast agriculture fortune and childhood rival to Aki Mikage. She often gets Hachiken's name wrong by replacing the Hachi (8) part of his name with different numbers, calling him "Shichiken" (7) and "Jūhachiken" (18). In the anime, she came to Ezo late in the second season (to fill up the slot vacated by Ichiro), but she is in Ezo from the beginning in the movie.
Tarō Beppu (別府 太郎, Beppu Tarō)
Voiced by: Nobuyuki Kobushi
A first year student and Yuugo's roommate. He will often help out Yuugo, such as the doing the chores he forgot about. He is in the Food Sciences program.
Shingo Hachiken (八軒 慎吾, Hachiken Shingo)
Voiced by: Katsuyuki Konishi
Yuugo's older brother who managed to get accepted to the University of Tokyo, the most prestigious university in Japan. However, Shingo later quit once he realized his father's dream was to have one of his sons accepted there. He decides to pursue his own dream of becoming a great cook, and travels the country in his underbone bike to perfect his cooking skills, often with humorously questionable results. He often drops by Ezo unannounced to check on Yuugo, since Yuugo usually refuses to talk with his family. Shingo is carefree and outgoing which is often a source of animosity from Yuugo, but he becomes a little more responsible after marrying Alexandra, a young Russian girl he meets during his travels.

== Production ==
After the completion of her successful fantasy series Fullmetal Alchemist, author Hiromu Arakawa and her publisher Shogakukan agreed that she should begin the more realistic Silver Spoon as a way to challenge herself as a manga artist and recruit new readers. Having grown up in a rural setting, many elements of the manga are drawn from Arakawa's experiences in her youth. For instance, characters such as the piggery teacher Ichiko Fuji and members of the Holstein fanclub are based on individuals she knew in her high school. Though the story contains matters like the protagonist Yuugo Hachiken's ethical dilemma over animal slaughter, Arakawa insisted that Silver Spoon is not a "green" manga. She stated that she simply wanted to tell the story of a high schooler's maturation, similar to how Fullmetal Alchemist focuses on the development of the main character Edward Elric rather than promoting alchemy.

Silver Spoon began its publication in Weekly Shōnen Sunday on April 6, 2011. It was serialized regularly until August 2014 when Arakawa announced she would slow the pace of producing new chapters of the manga so that she could care for a family member in declining health. After an eight-month hiatus, the manga briefly resumed in April 2015 until another short hiatus was announced the following month.

After the release of the manga's 13th volume, the author announced its "imminent" conclusion. She later explained that she had originally planned to depict Yuugo's first year at Ooezo in detail, followed by rushed second year and shortened third year, and his eventual life after graduation. In 2016, new chapters were published from January to February and August to September. The manga went on hiatus in July 2017, after three chapters were published. Four chapters were published between May and June 2018. The four last chapters were published from November 6–27, 2019.

== Media ==
=== Manga ===
Written and illustrated by Hiromu Arakawa, Silver Spoon started in Shogakukan's shōnen manga magazine Weekly Shōnen Sunday magazine on April 6, 2011. It became one of the magazine's main features not long after. The manga finished on November 27, 2019. Its individual chapters were collected in 15 tankōbon volumes, released from July 15, 2011, to February 18, 2020.

The manga has been licensed for English-language release in Singapore by Shogakukan Asia, while in North America, Yen Press announced the acquisition of the manga in July 2017 and published the volumes between February 27, 2018, and September 22, 2020.

==== Volumes ====
No.	Original release date	Original ISBN	English release date	English ISBN
1	July 15, 2011	978-4-09-123180-2	February 27, 2018	978-0-316-41619-1
1. "Tale of Spring 1" (春の巻①, Haru no Maki 1); 2. "Tale of Spring 2" (春の巻②, Haru no Maki 2); 3. "Tale of Spring 3" (春の巻③, Haru no Maki 3); 4. "Tale of Spring 4" (春の巻④, Haru no Maki 4); 5. "Tale of Spring 5" (春の巻⑤, Haru no Maki 5); 6. "Tale of Spring 6" (春の巻⑥, Haru no Maki 6); 7. "Tale of Spring 7" (春の巻⑦, Haru no Maki 7); 8. "Tale of Spring 8" (春の巻⑧, Haru no Maki 8)
2	December 14, 2011	978-4-09-123427-8	April 24, 2018	978-1-9753-2619-7
9. "Tale of Spring 9" (春の巻⑨, Haru no Maki 9); 10. "Tale of Spring 10" (春の巻⑩, Haru no Maki 10); 11. "Tale of Summer 1" (夏の巻①, Natsu no Maki 1); 12. "Tale of Summer 2" (夏の巻②, Natsu no Maki 2); 13. "Tale of Summer 3" (夏の巻③, Natsu no Maki 3); 14. "Tale of Summer 4" (夏の巻④, Natsu no Maki 4); 15. "Tale of Summer 5" (夏の巻⑤, Natsu no Maki 5); 16. "Tale of Summer 6" (夏の巻⑥, Natsu no Maki 6); 17. "Tale of Summer 7" (夏の巻⑦, Natsu no Maki 7)
3	April 18, 2012	978-4-09-123653-1	June 26, 2018	978-1-9753-2746-0
18. "Tale of Summer 8" (夏の巻⑧, Natsu no Maki 8); 19. "Tale of Summer 9" (夏の巻⑨, Natsu no Maki 9); 20. "Tale of Summer 10" (夏の巻⑩, Natsu no Maki 10); 21. "Tale of Summer 11" (夏の巻⑪, Natsu no Maki 11); 22. "Tale of Summer 12" (夏の巻⑫, Natsu no Maki 12); 23. "Tale of Summer 13" (夏の巻⑬, Natsu no Maki 13); 24. "Tale of Summer 14" (夏の巻⑭, Natsu no Maki 14); 25. "Tale of Summer 15" (夏の巻⑮, Natsu no Maki 15); 26. "Tale of Summer 16" (夏の巻⑯, Natsu no Maki 16)
4	July 18, 2012	978-4-09-123772-9	August 21, 2018	978-1-9753-2759-0
27. "Tale of Summer 17" (夏の巻⑰, Natsu no Maki 17); 28. "Tale of Summer 18" (夏の巻⑱, Natsu no Maki 18); 29. "Tale of Summer 19" (夏の巻⑲, Natsu no Maki 19); 30. "Summer Memories (Part 1)" (夏の思い出（前編）, Natsu no Omoide (Zenpen)); 31. "Summer Memories (Part 2)" (夏の思い出（後編）, Natsu no Omoide (Kouhen)); 32. "Tale of Autumn 1" (秋の巻①, Aki no Maki 1); 33. "Tale of Autumn 2" (秋の巻②, Aki no Maki 2); 34. "Tale of Autumn 3" (秋の巻③, Aki no Maki 3); 35. "Tale of Autumn 4" (秋の巻④, Aki no Maki 4)
5	October 18, 2012	978-4-09-123886-3	October 30, 2018	978-1-9753-2760-6
36. "Tale of Autumn 5" (秋の巻⑤, Aki no Maki 5); 37. "Tale of Autumn 6" (秋の巻⑥, Aki no Maki 6); 38. "Tale of Autumn 7" (秋の巻⑦, Aki no Maki 7); 39. "Tale of Autumn 8" (秋の巻⑧, Aki no Maki 8); 40. "Tale of Autumn 9" (秋の巻⑨, Aki no Maki 9); 41. "Tale of Autumn 10" (秋の巻⑩, Aki no Maki 10); 42. "Tale of Autumn 11" (秋の巻⑪, Aki no Maki 11); 43. "Tale of Autumn 12" (秋の巻⑫, Aki no Maki 12); 44. "Tale of Autumn 13" (秋の巻⑬, Aki no Maki 13)
6	January 18, 2013	978-4-09-124169-6	December 11, 2018	978-1-9753-2761-3
45. "Tale of Autumn 14" (秋の巻⑭, Aki no Maki 14); 46. "Tale of Autumn 15" (秋の巻⑮, Aki no Maki 15); 47. "Tale of Autumn 16" (秋の巻⑯, Aki no Maki 16); 48. "Tale of Autumn 17" (秋の巻⑰, Aki no Maki 17); 49. "Tale of Autumn 18" (秋の巻⑱, Aki no Maki 18); 50. "Tale of Autumn 19" (秋の巻⑲, Aki no Maki 19); 51. "Tale of Autumn 20" (秋の巻⑳, Aki no Maki 20); 52. "Tale of Autumn 21" (秋の巻㉑, Aki no Maki 21); 53. "Tale of Autumn 22" (秋の巻㉒, Aki no Maki 22)
7	April 18, 2013	978-4-09-124285-3	February 19, 2019	978-1-9753-2762-0
54. "Tale of Autumn 23" (秋の巻㉓, Aki no Maki 23); 55. "Tale of Autumn 24" (秋の巻㉔, Aki no Maki 24); 56. "Tale of Autumn 25" (秋の巻㉕, Aki no Maki 25); 57. "Tale of Autumn 26" (秋の巻㉖, Aki no Maki 26); 58. "Tale of Autumn 27" (秋の巻㉗, Aki no Maki 27); 59. "Tale of Autumn 28" (秋の巻㉘, Aki no Maki 28); 60. "Tale of Autumn 29" (秋の巻㉙, Aki no Maki 29); 61. "Tale of Autumn 30" (秋の巻㉚, Aki no Maki 30)
8	July 11, 2013	978-4-09-124346-1	April 30, 2019	978-1-9753-2763-7
62. "Tale of Autumn 31" (秋の巻㉛, Aki no Maki 31); 63. "Tale of Autumn 32" (秋の巻㉜, Aki no Maki 32); 64. "Tale of Winter 1" (冬の巻①, Fuyu no Maki 1); 65. "Tale of Winter 2" (冬の巻②, Fuyu no Maki 2); 66. "Tale of Winter 3" (冬の巻③, Fuyu no Maki 3); 67. "Tale of Winter 4" (冬の巻④, Fuyu no Maki 4); 68. "Tale of Winter 5" (冬の巻⑤, Fuyu no Maki 5); 69. "Tale of Winter 6" (冬の巻⑥, Fuyu no Maki 6); 70. "Tale of Winter 7" (冬の巻⑦, Fuyu no Maki 7)
9	October 18, 2013	978-4-09-124474-1	June 18, 2019	978-1-9753-2764-4
71. "Tale of Winter 8" (冬の巻⑧, Fuyu no Maki 8); 72. "Tale of Winter 9" (冬の巻⑨, Fuyu no Maki 9); 73. "Tale of Winter 10" (冬の巻⑩, Fuyu no Maki 10); 74. "Tale of Winter 11" (冬の巻⑪, Fuyu no Maki 11); 75. "Tale of Winter 12" (冬の巻⑫, Fuyu no Maki 12); 76. "Tale of Winter 13" (冬の巻⑬, Fuyu no Maki 13); 77. "Tale of Winter 14" (冬の巻⑭, Fuyu no Maki 14); 78. "Tale of Winter 15" (冬の巻⑮, Fuyu no Maki 15); 79. "Tale of Winter 16" (冬の巻⑯, Fuyu no Maki 16)
10	January 8, 2014	978-4-09-159177-7	August 27, 2019	978-1-9753-2765-1
80. "Tale of Winter 17" (冬の巻⑰, Fuyu no Maki 17); 81. "Tale of Winter 18" (冬の巻⑱, Fuyu no Maki 18); 82. "Tale of Winter 19" (冬の巻⑲, Fuyu no Maki 19); 83. "Tale of Winter 20" (冬の巻⑳, Fuyu no Maki 21); 84. "Tale of Winter 21" (冬の巻㉑, Fuyu no Maki 21); 85. "Tale of Winter 22" (冬の巻㉒, Fuyu no Maki 22); 86. "Tale of Winter 23" (冬の巻㉓, Fuyu no Maki 23); 87. "Tale of Winter 24" (冬の巻㉔, Fuyu no Maki 24); 88. "Tale of Winter 25" (冬の巻㉕, Fuyu no Maki 25)
11	March 5, 2014	978-4-09-124574-8	October 29, 2019	978-1-9753-2766-8
89. "Tale of Winter 26" (冬の巻㉖, Fuyu no Maki 26); 90. "Tale of Winter 27" (冬の巻㉗, Fuyu no Maki 27); 91. "Tale of Winter 28" (冬の巻㉘, Fuyu no Maki 28); 92. "Tale of Winter 29" (冬の巻㉙, Fuyu no Maki 29); 93. "Tale of Winter 30" (冬の巻㉚, Fuyu no Maki 30); 94. "Tale of Winter 31" (冬の巻㉛, Fuyu no Maki 31); 95. "Tale of Winter 32" (冬の巻㉜, Fuyu no Maki 32); 96. "Tale of Winter 33" (冬の巻㉝, Fuyu no Maki 33)
12	August 18, 2014	978-4-09-125088-9	December 17, 2019	978-1-9753-5313-1
97. "Tale of Winter 34" (冬の巻㉞, Fuyu no Maki 34); 98. "Tale of Four Seasons 1" (四季の巻①, Shiki no Maki 1); 99. "Tale of Four Seasons 2" (四季の巻②, Shiki no Maki 2); 100. "Tale of Four Seasons 3" (四季の巻③, Shiki no Maki 3); 101. "Tale of Four Seasons 4" (四季の巻④, Shiki no Maki 4); 102. "Tale of Four Seasons 5" (四季の巻⑤, Shiki no Maki 5); 103. "Tale of Four Seasons 6" (四季の巻⑥, Shiki no Maki 6); 104. "Tale of Four Seasons 7" (四季の巻⑦, Shiki no Maki 7); 105. "Tale of Four Seasons 8" (四季の巻⑧, Shiki no Maki 8)
13	June 18, 2015	978-4-09-126059-8	February 18, 2020	978-1-9753-5314-8
106. "Tale of Four Seasons 9" (四季の巻⑨, Shiki no Maki 9); 107. "Tale of Four Seasons 10" (四季の巻⑩, Shiki no Maki 10); 108. "Tale of Four Seasons 11" (四季の巻⑪, Shiki no Maki 11); 109. "Tale of Four Seasons 12" (四季の巻⑫, Shiki no Maki 12); 110. "Tale of Four Seasons 13" (四季の巻⑬, Shiki no Maki 13); 111. "Tale of Four Seasons 14" (四季の巻⑭, Shiki no Maki 14); 112. "Tale of Four Seasons 15" (四季の巻⑮, Shiki no Maki 15); 113. "Tale of Four Seasons 16" (四季の巻⑯, Shiki no Maki 16)
14	August 18, 2017	978-4-09-127720-6	April 28, 2020	978-1-9753-5315-5
114. "Tale of Four Seasons 17" (四季の巻⑰, Shiki no Maki 17); 115. "Tale of Four Seasons 18" (四季の巻⑱, Shiki no Maki 18); 116. "Tale of Four Seasons 19" (四季の巻⑲, Shiki no Maki 19); 117. "Tale of Four Seasons 20" (四季の巻⑳, Shiki no Maki 20); 118. "Tale of Four Seasons 21" (四季の巻㉑, Shiki no Maki 21); 119. "Tale of Four Seasons 22" (四季の巻㉒, Shiki no Maki 22); 120. "Tale of Four Seasons 23" (四季の巻㉓, Shiki no Maki 23); 121. "Tale of Four Seasons 24" (四季の巻㉔, Shiki no Maki 24); 122. "Tale of Four Seasons 25" (四季の巻㉕, Shiki no Maki 25)
15	February 18, 2020	978-4-09-129549-1; 978-4-09-943064-1 (LE)	September 22, 2020	978-1-9753-5365-0
123. "Tale of Four Seasons 26" (四季の巻㉖, Shiki no Maki 26); 124. "Tale of Four Seasons 27" (四季の巻㉗, Shiki no Maki 27); 125. "Tale of Four Seasons 28" (四季の巻㉘, Shiki no Maki 28); 126. "Tale of Four Seasons 29" (四季の巻㉙, Shiki no Maki 29); 127. "Tale of Four Seasons 30" (四季の巻㉚, Shiki no Maki 30); 128. "Tale of Four Seasons 31" (四季の巻㉛, Shiki no Maki 31); 129. "Tale of Four Seasons 32" (四季の巻㉜, Shiki no Maki 32); 130. "Tale of Four Seasons 33" (四季の巻㉝, Shiki no Maki 33); 131. "Tale of Yuugo Hachiken" (八軒勇吾の巻, Hachiken Yūgo no Maki)

=== Anime ===
An anime television series produced by A-1 Pictures aired for eleven episodes from July 12 to September 20, 2013. (Note: Fuji TV listed the air dates for the series on Thursday at 24:55, which is effectively Friday at 12:55 a.m. JST.) Tomohiko Itō directed the series with assistant director Kotomi Deai. Taku Kishimoto wrote the scripts, while Jun Nakai served as character designer and chief animation director, and Shusei Murai scored the music. A second season aired from January 10 to March 28, 2014. (Note: Fuji TV listed the air dates for the series on Thursday at 24:50, which is effectively Friday at 12:50 a.m. JST.) For the first season, the opening theme is "Kiss you" by Miwa, while the ending theme is "Hello Especially" by Sukima Switch. For the second season, the opening theme is "Life" by Fujifabric and the ending theme is "Oto no Naru Hō e" by Goose House.

The anime has been licensed by Aniplex of America for streaming and home video in North America. Aniplex of America released the first season on DVD on July 15, 2014, and the second on December 16 of that same year.

==== Episodes ====
===== Season 1 =====
No.	Title	Directed by	Original release date
1	"Welcome to Ezo Ag"; Transliteration: "Ezonō e, yōkoso" (Japanese: エゾノーへ、ようこそ)	Tomohiko Itō	July 12, 2013
Running away from home, Yuugo Hachiken leaves the urban life at Sapporo to enroll at the Ooezo Agricultural High School and it does not take long for him to learn that adapting himself to his new environment will not be easy.
2	"Hachiken Rides a Horse"; Transliteration: "Hachiken, uma ni noru" (Japanese: 八軒、馬に乗る)	Ho Pyeon-gang	July 19, 2013
Getting used to his new environment, Hachiken must enroll at one of the school clubs according to the curriculum, and encouraged by his classmate Aki Mikage, he ends up joining her at the equestrian club. However, he spends the day doing menial tasks like cleaning the stables and just when he is starting to regret his decision, he is invited to experience the joy of riding a horse for the first time.
3	"Hachiken Meets Pork Bowl"; Transliteration: "Hachiken, butadon to deau" (Japanese: 八軒、豚丼と出会う)	Kazuo Nogami	July 26, 2013
With most of the students on leave at Golden Week, Hachiken, Mikage and their classmate Ichiro Komaba watch a Ban'ei horse race together, and despite the horse bred at Mikage's farm do not win, she gets some relief learning that he gets well placed enough to have a chance of not being killed for livestock. After returning to the school, Hachiken pities a piglet that is the weakest and smallest among its siblings and, giving it the nickname "Pork-Bowl," decides to take care of it, just to later know that it will be sent to the slaughterhouse in three months.
4	"Hachiken Bakes Pizza"; Transliteration: "Hachiken, piza o yaku" (Japanese: 八軒、ピザを焼く)	Yasuo Muroi	August 2, 2013
During the regular campus cleanup, Hachiken stumbles upon an abandoned brick oven (which was later revealed to be owned by the School Headmaster) and his classmates convince him to make pizza with it, as most of them never ate one before. As Hachiken and his friends gather the necessary supplies and ingredients throughout the campus, a teacher from his old school in Sapporo drops at Ezo to check on him.
5	"Hachiken Runs Off"; Transliteration: "Hachiken, dassō suru" (Japanese: 八軒、脱走する)	Ken Andō	August 9, 2013
The boys take heed of a certain special event to be held at night and come with a plan to slip past curfew to get a glimpse of it. Having no idea about what is it or why his classmates are so pumped up with it, Hachiken ends up dragged along in their scheme.
6	"Hachiken Stays with the Mikages"; Transliteration: "Hachiken, Mikage-ke ni iku" (Japanese: 八軒、御影家に行く)	Kotomi Deai	August 16, 2013
Learning that the dorms will be closed for summer vacation but refusing to return home, Hachiken accepts Mikage's offer to work at her family's farm. However, once realizing that he has not notified his parents about it, he looks for a place with cellphone signal until he gets lost and is rescued by Komaba. In the events that followed, he got to dress his first deer as a result.
7	"Hachiken Goes to Giga Farm"; Transliteration: "Hachiken, Giga fāmu e" (Japanese: 八軒、ギガファームへ)	Ho Pyeon-gang	August 23, 2013
Hachiken and Mikage take a break from work and pay a visit to Giga Farm, a huge industrial farm that belongs to their classmate Tamako Inada's family. In the occasion, Hachiken learns about the rather harsh reality of the animals living there and realizes Mikage's worries about her family's expectations for her future.
8	"Hachiken Makes a Huge Mistake"; Transliteration: "Hachiken, dai shittai o enjiru" (Japanese: 八軒、大失態を演じる)	Kiyoshi Murayama	August 30, 2013
Hachiken's older brother Shingo pays a visit at the Mikage farm to check on him, much to his young brother's chagrin. Just as his part-time job is about to finish, Hachiken's carelessness leads to damage to the farm. Wanting to take responsibility for the accident, he refuses to be paid for his work. However, he is convinced by the Mikages to accept payment as they consider that all the help he provided them during these three weeks were worth it, despite what happened.
9	"Hachiken Hesitates over Pork Bowl"; Transliteration: "Hachiken, butadon ni mayou" (Japanese: 八軒、豚丼に迷う)	Tomotaka Shibayama	September 6, 2013
Back from summer break, Hachiken learns that Pork-Bowl has not grown as much as its peers and takes extra measures to ensure that it gains weight faster, even knowing that this will make things even more painful for him when the time comes to part with it.
10	"Hachiken Says Goodbye to Pork Bowl"; Transliteration: "Hachiken, butadon to wakareru" (Japanese: 八軒、豚丼と別れる)	Tomohiko Itō	September 13, 2013
The time has come for Pork-Bowl to be sent to the slaughterhouse and Hachiken decides to make use of the money he earned during summer vacation to buy all its meat. After the meat is delivered to him, Hachiken's friends come with several ideas about what to do with it. He decided to turn 50 kilos of the meat into bacon.
11	"Take Off Running, Hachiken"; Transliteration: "Hashiridase, Hachiken" (Japanese: 走り出せ、八軒)	Kotomi Deai	September 20, 2013
The bacon Hachiken prepared with Pork-Bowl's meat becomes a fad among the students and it does not take long for it to run out. As Komaba plays in the local baseball team aiming for the nationals, his friends come to the stadium to cheer for him and Hachiken realizes that six months has passed since he enrolled in Ezo Ag and, unlike his friends, he still has not decided what path he should take in life.

===== Season 2 =====
No.	Title	Directed by	Original release date
1	"Hachiken Becomes the Club Vice President"; Transliteration: "Hachiken, fukubuchō ni naru" (Japanese: 八軒、副部長になる)	Jun Soga	January 10, 2014
The seniors from the Equestrian Club appoint Hachiken as the new vice-president against his will. Troubled about it, he later witnesses Mikage crying after having a serious conversation with Komaba and can't stop worrying about them as well, even after they tell him to forget about it.
2	"Hachiken Adopts Vice Prez"; Transliteration: "Hachiken, fukubuchō o hirou" (Japanese: 八軒、副ぶちょーを拾う)	Yasuhiro Geshi	January 17, 2014
Hachiken finds an abandoned puppy during campus clean-up and decides to adopt it. However, taking care of his new pet is not an easy task, as he not only needs money for vaccines and registration, but has to train it (the food bill is thanks to a donation box Tokiwa attached to his collar). Yoshino and everyone in the Equestrian Club temporarily named the puppy "Fukubucho no Inu" ("The Vice President's Dog"), which, by the next day, was shortened to just "Fukubucho" ("Vice President"), with hilarious results for Hachiken, THE Equestrian Club vice-president. Also in this episode, Hachiken injures himself after trying to save Komaba from getting pinned by a cow that slipped on some manure.
3	"Hachiken Jumps High"; Transliteration: "Hachiken, takaku tobu" (Japanese: 八軒、高く跳ぶ)	Tomotaka Shibayama	January 24, 2014
The newbies from the Equestrian Club have their first jump class, but Hachiken is the only one who fails to have his horse jump an obstacle, bringing some unpleasant memories of his past to surface. Claiming that it needs more than words to have him figure out the reason why, Mikage takes him to a jumping competition.
4	"Minamikujou Appears"; Transliteration: "Minamikujō, arawaru" (Japanese: 南九条、あらわる)	Hiroyuki Kanbe	January 31, 2014
Hachiken participates in his first official jumping competition, where he finished fourth in his category (with Maron). In the occasion he and Mikage have a short meeting with Ayame Minamikujō, Mikage's childhood friend and self-proclaimed rival, and is startled when meeting his brother again by surprise.
5	"Hachiken Has His Hands Full"; Transliteration: "Hachiken, ōwarawa" (Japanese: 八軒、大わらわ)	Hiroki Negishi	February 7, 2014
With the Ezo Ag Festival fast approaching, the Equestrian Club begins work on Ban'ei horse racing track, despite Hachiken tasking himself with way too much work. Afterwards Hachiken takes initiative and asks Mikage out on a date and his feelings for her are revealed by her friends. However, on the morning of the festival, Hachiken suddenly collapses on the race track.
6	"Mikage Gives It Her All"; Transliteration: "Mikage, funtō su" (Japanese: 御影、奮闘す)	Yasuhito Nishikata	February 14, 2014
Hachiken wakes up at the hospital and comes face to face with his father, who wastes no time blaming the Ezo Ag institution for Hachiken's fatigue. Meanwhile, Mikage and the Equestrian Club work their hardest to make the festival a success and praise Hachiken for all his hard work upon his return.
7	"Komaba Takes The Mound"; Transliteration: "Komaba, maundo ni tatsu" (Japanese: 駒場、マウンドに立つ)	Ken Andō	February 28, 2014
The time has come for the Regional Baseball Championship and the students cheer for Ezo Ag's team, hoping for them to reach the National tournament, specially for Komaba who is one of the team's highlights.
8	"Hachiken Howls"; Transliteration: "Hachiken, hoeru" (Japanese: 八軒、咆える)	Hironori Aoyagi	March 7, 2014
Hachiken discovers that Komaba has lost not only the Championship, but the last chance for him to settle the debts of his farm and is forced to quit school and look for a job to help at home. Despite knowing that there is not anything he can do about it, Hachiken can't bear to accept the fact that Komaba was forced to give up on his ambitions before he could even get the chance to fight for them.
9	"The Last Milk"; Transliteration: "Saigo no gyūnyū" (Japanese: 最後の牛乳)	Shunsuke Machiya	March 14, 2014
Despite knowing that there is nothing he could do for Komaba's sake, Hachiken claims to Mikage that it is fine for them to rely on him and they pay a visit at Komaba's farm to pay their respects as all their cows are seized to pay for their debt. However, with her father being a co-guarantor of the Komaba farm's loan, Mikage's farm is also in difficulties and when they are forced to sell all their horses, she comes with an important decision with Hachiken's support.
10	"Dream"; Transliteration: "Yume" (Japanese: 夢)	Tomotaka Shibayama	March 21, 2014
Determined to follow her dream of working with horses, Mikage is allowed to work under her uncle instead of inheriting her father's farm under the condition of making into college and Hachiken agrees to help her.
11	"Over and Over Again"; Transliteration: "Nandodemo" (Japanese: 何度でも)	Kotomi Deai	March 28, 2014
Hachiken returns home to Sapporo to obtain his brother's study guides for Mikage and has a frustratingly insightful encounter with his father. Afterwards Hachiken's mother visits Ezo Ag to better understand the school he chose and leaves knowing that he is growing into a better person. Finally, as the winter season approaches, Hachiken and his friends begin planning their respective futures.

=== Live-action film ===
A live-action film based on the manga was officially announced in the Nikkan Sports and Sports Nippon newspapers on August 7, 2013. Kento Nakajima played Yuugo Hachiken, with Alice Hirose as Aki Mikage and Tomohiro Ichikawa as Ichiro Komaba. The film was directed by Keisuke Yoshida, with the production companies TBS and Wilco and the distributor Toho. It premiered in Tokyo on March 7, 2014, and was also shown at the Japan Film Festival of San Francisco on July 22, 2014. The film's theme song is "Hidamari", performed by Yuzu. Iwasawa Koji wrote and composed the song for the movie.

== Reception ==
=== Manga ===
==== Sales ====
Since its first volume, Silver Spoon had been well received by readers. It became the fastest Shogakukan title at the time to reach the mark of one million first printing copies, a year and three months after the manga was launched. According to Oricon, it was also the seventh best-selling manga in Japan in 2012. By October 2013, it has sold 12 million copies in Japan. By 2014, the series has sold over 15 million copies in Japan. By July, 2017, the manga had over 16 million copies in print. By February 2020, the manga had over 17 million copies in print.

==== Awards ====
Silver Spoon ranked second on the "Nationwide Bookstore Employees' Recommended Comics" by the Honya Club website in 2012. Silver Spoon won the fifth Manga Taishō Award's Grand Prize in 2012, and the 58th Shogakukan Manga Award (shōnen category) in 2013. In 2013, Silver Spoon won the first Japan Food Culture Contents Award. It was one of nine nominees for the 19th annual Tezuka Osamu Cultural Prize in 2015.

==== Reviews ====
Publishers Weekly concluded that the work is "a side of Japanese high school life seldom seen in manga, making for an irresistible series." Barnes & Noble listed Silver Spoon on their list of "Our Favorite Manga of 2018".

=== Anime ===
In November 2019, Crunchyroll listed Silver Spoon in their "Top 100 best anime of the 2010s".

== See also ==
- Moyasimon: Tales of Agriculture, a similar manga series by Masayuki Ishikawa, set at a fictional agricultural university
