= In Other Lands =

2017 young adult fantasy novel by Sarah Rees Brennan

- Author: Sarah Rees Brennan
- Language: English
- Genre: Young adult fantasy
- Publisher: Big Mouth House
- Publication date: 15 August 2017
- Publication place: Ireland
- ISBN: 978-1-6187-3120-3
- Followed by: Tears Waiting to Be Diamonds

In Other Lands is a 2017 young adult fantasy novel by Sarah Rees Brennan. It was nominated for numerous awards and won the 2017 Bisexual Book Award for Teen/Young Adult Fiction.

Before being published as In Other Lands, Brennan wrote the initial story, "The Turn of the Story" on her website and her LiveJournal account under the profile "sarahtales"; the story was based on the characters previously created in Brennan's short story “Wings in the Morning” in Kelly Link and Gavin J. Grant’s anthology Monstrous Affections.

In January 2023, Brennan released a two-part short story sequel called "Tears Waiting to Be Diamonds" on The Sunday Morning Transport, set 10 years past the events of In Other Lands.

== Plot ==
Elliot Schafer, a 13 year old English boy, learns he can see across the Border (a wall that separates our world from a fantasy world). He decides to go to a military training school there after meeting Serene-Heart-in-the-Chaos-of-Battle (also known as Serene,) a young elf girl who Elliot is immediately enamored with. Elliot also meets classmate Luke Sunborn, a boy from an affluent local family, and dislikes him. While at school, Elliot's prickly personality causes rifts between him and his classmates. When summer comes, Elliot returns home to his father (his mother abandoned the family shortly after Elliot was born.)

Elliot continues his schooling, becoming increasingly frustrated by the political processes that emphasize war over peace talks in conflicts. He starts writing treaties and participating in international negotiations. When he is 15, Elliot and Serene begin dating, but their relationship is short-lived. While on a summer trip with friends, Elliot realizes he is bisexual, and dates a man, Jase, for some time before realizing the relationship is unhealthy. Eventually, Elliot and Luke begin dating, and Elliot provides support to Luke (who is still reckoning with his newly-learned identity as half-harpy.)

== Reception ==
In Other Lands was well received by critics, including starred reviews from Kirkus Reviews and Publishers Weekly. Kirkus referred to the novel as "stellar, if dense and lengthy," whereas Publishers Weekly called it "hilarious, irreverent, and multilayered."

Booklist's Cindy Welch highlighted how "Brennan turns stereotypes upside down" and noted that "this is a school story for older youth, with freewheeling (but not explicit) sexuality, a dedicated pacifist as a main character, and slightly cynical humor that masks great heart." Welch recommended pairing the novel with J. K. Rowling's Harry Potter books, Terry Pratchett's books, Maggie Stiefvater’s Raven Cycle, and William Goldman’s The Princess Bride. Lee Mandelo, reviewing from the Tor.com magazine, described the novel as a "satisfying, thoughtful, and fun read".

== Awards and honors ==
In Other Lands is a Junior Library Guild book. In 2017, The New York Times included it on their list of the fall's best young adult fantasy novels.

Awards for In Other Lands
Year	Award	Result	Ref.
2017	Bisexual Book Award for Teen/Young Adult Fiction	Winner	
2017	Goodreads Choice Award for Best Young Adult Fantasy & Science Fiction	Nominee	
2018	European Science Fiction Society Award for Best Work of Fiction	Finalist	
2018	Locus Award for Best Young Adult Book	Finalist	
2018	World Science Fiction Society Award for Best Young Adult Book	Finalist	
2019	ALA Rainbow List	Selection	
2019	Mythopoeic Fantasy Award for Adult Literature	Finalist	
