= The Demon's Covenant =

2009 novel by Sarah Rees Brennan

- First edition
- Author: Sarah Rees Brennan
- Cover artist: Sam Hadley
- Language: English
- Series: The Demon's ...
- Genre: Novel
- Publisher: Simon & Schuster
- Publication date: 14 May 2009
- Publication place: Ireland
- Media type: Print (hardback and e-book)
- Pages: 440
- OCLC: 432993907
- Preceded by: The Demon's Lexicon
- Followed by: The Demon's Surrender

The Demon's Covenant is a 2010 novel by Irish author Sarah Rees Brennan. It is published by Simon & Schuster. It is the second book in "The Demon's ..." trilogy, the first being The Demon's Lexicon, released in 2010, and the third, The Demon's Surrender, released in June 2011.

== Plot summary ==
Mae has learned that her brother, Jamie, has magic powers. Gerald, the leader of the Obsidian Circle, is trying to persuade Jamie to join the magicians that tried to kill Mae and Jamie before. Mae tries to get Nick and Alan to rescue Jamie, but they themselves are in trouble. Nick has a new power that makes every magician in England want him dead. Mae knows she cannot trust anyone so she makes her own plan to save everyone.

== Character List ==
- Nick Ryves - Protective of friends and family. Likes knives and fighting. He is a demon in a human's body. He is not Alan's real brother. He does not have feelings like humans.
- Alan Ryves - Nick's older brother, a red head who wears glasses. Has a crippled leg and is described as half Nick's size. While he is deadly with guns, he is also kind and always tries to help other people. When dealing with hard situations, he likes to tell gruesome facts as entertainment.
- Mae Crawford - Headstrong and loud, she is the big sister of Jamie Crawford. She has pink hair and dresses outrageously. Likes being in control.
- Jamie Crawford - Mae's younger brother. A powerful magician whom many magicians' circles want. Always protected by Nick. At first he is scared of Nick, but at the end of the book he becomes friends with Nick. Hates Seb and does not approve of Seb dating his sister. Tries to act tough. Caring and comforts people. Does not like Mae to worry. He is in love with Gerald.
- Seb - He is dating Mae Crawford. Liked by many girls. Appears to dislike Jamie because he likes intimidating and bullying Jamie. Wears long sleeves all the time. Likes drawing people.
- Merris Cromwell - Mysterious, unofficial leader of the Goblin Market. Very rich, she earns her money by running Mezentius House, a hospital/prison for bodies possessed by demons. Gerald revealed she has bone cancer.
- Sin - A beautiful dancer at the Goblin Market. Has many admirers. Doesn't like Alan because they have clashing personalities. Friends with Mae. Has a younger brother named Toby. Used to like Nick when they did not know he was a demon.
- Black Arthur - Magician, leader of the Obsidian Circle. He is dead in this book.
- Gerald - Magician in the Obsidian Circle. He is the current leader of the Obsidian Circle in this book. Befriends Jamie.
- Anzu - Demon, who usually takes the form of an eagle/human. He has marked Jamie and Alan.
- Annabel- Mae and Jamie's mom. Not a natural mother. Athletic. Does not believe in magic.
- Liannan - An icy demon, succubus, who thinks that Nick is her past lover. She is commonly known as "Yuki Onna" in Japan.

== Reception ==
Kirkus Reviews opened their review by writing, "Plots thicken, characters deepen and snark is bantered with witty abandon in this dark fantasy". School Library Journal's Anthony C. Doyle similarly discussed how "an undercurrent of wit and subtle sarcasm turns this dark story of demons, magic, and dysfunctional families into an affecting and fun read." On behalf of Booklist, Cindy Welch called the novel a "delicious mix of magic, conflicted romance, and trust issues".

Kirkus praised the prose, which they said "sparkles with clever humor, arresting metaphors and more than a hint of sexy romance". Welch also noted that "Brennan's writing is stronger and more confident" than in the trilogy's first book, The Demon's Lexicon. While Doyle agreed that "overall the writing is strong with lots of action and engaging characters", they mentioned that "a few passages are confusing".
