= Raiden-18 =

Japanese manga series

- Volume cover
- Genre: Comedy; Science fiction
- Manga
- Written by: Hiromu Arakawa
- Published by: Shogakukan
- Imprint: Sunday GX Comics Special
- Magazine: Monthly Sunday Gene-X
- Original run: July 19, 2005 – January 19, 2021
- Volumes: 1

Raiden-18 (stylized in all caps) is a Japanese manga by Hiromu Arakawa. It was irregularly published in Shogakukan's seinen manga magazine Monthly Sunday Gene-X from 2005 to 2021, with its chapters collected in a single tankōbon volume.

== Publication ==
Written and illustrated by Hiromu Arakawa, Raiden-18 was irregularly published in Shogakukan's seinen manga magazine Monthly Sunday Gene-X; the first two chapters were published on July 19 and December 19, 2005; the third one on December 18, 2010; and the fourth on January 19, 2021. Shogakukan collected the chapters, alongside an epilogue chapter, in a single tankōbon volume released on June 9, 2021.

No.	Japanese release date	Japanese ISBN
1	June 9, 2021	978-4-09-157638-5
Chapters 1–4; Epilogue
