= Nikolas Sideris =

Greek composer (born 1977)

Nikolas Sideris (born Nikolaos Sideris in 1977) is a Greek composer, pianist, video game composer, music publisher and editor. His work includes concert and educational piano music and music for independent video games. He is the founder of the contemporary-music publishing company Editions Musica Ferrum and served as an editor and publisher of the score edition of Susanne Kessel’s international 250 Piano Pieces for Beethoven project.

== Education and research ==
Sideris was born in Athens, Greece, in 1977. He studied composition at Royal Holloway, University of London, receiving a master’s degree in composition with distinction in 2005 and subsequently a PhD in composition. He also received a piano diploma with honours and qualifications in harmony, counterpoint and fugue. His studies in the United Kingdom were funded by the Greek State Scholarships Foundation (IKY).

His doctoral thesis, Music technology in contemporary concert hall music: Portfolio of musical compositions and accompanying commentary (2010), examined the role of music technology and the balance between technological and human input in composition, performance, recording, playback and storage.

One of the works discussed in the portfolio was The City Under Different Eyes, for solo piano and audio manipulation. The work was designed to exist in recorded form, using custom software to assemble sections of performances by different pianists so that successive playbacks could differ.

Sideris has also worked as a pianist, and his compositions have been performed internationally.

== Composition ==
Sideris’s output includes solo, chamber and educational music, with piano music forming a substantial part of his published work.

In 2013, his Piano Stories, a collection for piano four hands, received the senior prize of the Second International Composition Competition Artistes en Herbe in Luxembourg.

His collection Fairyland in Treble consists of eleven teacher–student piano duets, adapted in part from music Sideris had originally composed for computer-game soundtracks. Reviewing the collection in 2015, pianist and teacher Joy Morin praised its variety and recommended it for intermediate students. The collection was also reviewed in ‘’International Piano’’ in 2015.

Later piano publications include ‘’Dusk of Day, Dawn of Night’‘,’‘Personalities’’ and ‘’It Takes Two to Tango’‘. Reviewing ’‘Dusk of Day, Dawn of Night’’ in 2019, pianist and educator Andrew Eales noted its combination of contemporary musical elements, melodic writing and humour, and identified stylistic connections with Sideris’s earlier piano music and his soundtrack for ‘’Nelly Cootalot’‘. Eales subsequently reviewed the two-volume’‘Personalities’’ collection, and included ‘’It Takes Two to Tango’’ in his selection of eight piano duet books of 2022.

Sideris’s ‘’O ihr Menschen, die ihr mich für feindselig, störrisch und misanthropisch haltet, wie unrecht thut ihr mir’‘, for solo piano, was commissioned by pianist Susanne Kessel for her’‘250 Piano Pieces for Beethoven’’ project. It was premiered by Kessel in Bonn on 29 November 2014 and subsequently performed in concerts and broadcasts in Germany and the Netherlands. The work was published in the first volume of the project’s score edition.

== Video game music ==
Sideris has worked as a composer and sound designer for independent video games since the 2000s. His doctoral commentary identifies his work in the computer-game industry as an influence on his research into music technology and digital creativity.

His early credits included ‘’A Tale of Two Kingdoms’’ and ‘’Diamonds in the Rough’‘. He subsequently provided music and sound effects for the experimental anti-war game’‘What Goes Around’’.

Sideris composed the music for ‘’Privates’’, developed by Size Five Games for Channel 4. The game received the British Academy Children’s Award for Learning–Secondary in 2011.

He composed the soundtrack for the 2012 adventure game ‘’Resonance’’. Contemporary reviews commented specifically on the score, including its contribution to the atmosphere of the game’s settings.

Sideris later composed the soundtrack for the adventure game ‘’Nelly Cootalot: The Fowl Fleet’‘. A 2016 review in’‘Alternative Magazine Online’’ noted the contribution of the music to the game’s atmosphere and charm. Music from the game was subsequently released as a standalone soundtrack and adapted for solo piano.

== Editions Musica Ferrum ==
Sideris founded Editions Musica Ferrum in 2012 as a publisher of contemporary concert music.

Among its publications was ‘’Beauty & Hope in the 21st Century’‘, a project combining contemporary piano compositions with visual art. The publication received coverage in specialist piano publications, including ’‘International Piano’’.

Editions Musica Ferrum became the publisher of the score edition of pianist Susanne Kessel’s ‘’250 Piano Pieces for Beethoven’’, an international composition project created in preparation for the 250th anniversary of Ludwig van Beethoven’s birth. Kessel conceived, curated and organised the project, while Sideris served as an editor and publisher of the score edition.

The first volume, containing 25 contemporary piano works, was published by Editions Musica Ferrum in 2015 and reviewed by Theresa Awiszus in ‘’Neue Musikzeitung’’ in 2016. Beethoven-Haus Bonn catalogued the edition with Kessel as concept creator, organiser and pianist and Sideris as editor.

The complete score edition comprised ten volumes, with Kessel and Sideris named as editors. Library catalogue records for later volumes identify Kessel as concept creator, pianist, organiser, editor and co-publisher, and Sideris as editor and publisher. Writing on completion of the project, pianist and educator Andrew Eales described its scope as monumental and interviewed Sideris about his work as editor and publisher.

== Selected works ==
=== Concert and piano music ===
- ‘’The City Under Different Eyes’’
- ‘’Exeliksis’’
- ‘’Piano Stories’’
- ‘’Fairyland in Treble’’
- ‘’O ihr Menschen’’
- ‘’Dusk of Day, Dawn of Night’’
- ‘’Personalities’’
- ‘’It Takes Two to Tango’’

=== Video game music ===
- ‘’A Tale of Two Kingdoms’’
- ‘’Diamonds in the Rough’’
- ‘’What Goes Around’’
- ‘’Privates’’
- ‘’Resonance’’
- ‘’Nelly Cootalot: The Fowl Fleet’’
