= Editions Musica Ferrum =

- Status: Active
- Founded: 2012
- Founder: Nikolas Sideris
- Country of origin: United Kingdom
- Headquarters location: Rickmansworth, Hertfordshire
- Distribution: Hal Leonard
- Publication types: Sheet music
- Nonfiction topics: Contemporary classical music, educational music
- Official website: www.musica-ferrum.com

Editions Musica Ferrum (EMF) is a British music publishing company specialising in contemporary concert and educational music. It was founded in Greece in 2012 by composer and pianist Nikolas Sideris and later relocated to the United Kingdom. Editions Musica Ferrum Ltd was incorporated in England and Wales in 2019.

The publisher's catalogue includes contemporary concert music, educational repertoire and multi-composer projects. Its publications have received regular coverage in the specialist piano press, with reviewers commenting on both the repertoire and the visual and physical presentation of its scores. Among the company's largest undertakings was the publication of the ten-volume score edition of Susanne Kessel's international 250 Piano Pieces for Beethoven project between 2015 and 2020.

== History ==
Editions Musica Ferrum was established by Sideris in Greece in 2012. The company initially concentrated on contemporary concert music by living composers.

During its first three years, its catalogue expanded from six composers to more than 50. A 2015 feature by Owen Mortimer in International Piano profiled Sideris and the publisher, discussing the company's growth and its emphasis on the visual design and physical presentation of its scores.

An early multi-composer publication was Beauty & Hope in the 21st Century, a collection of substantial contemporary works for solo piano by nine living composers from different countries. The project brought music and visual art together, with each composition associated with a work of art. International Piano subsequently described the publication as an "intriguing collection".

EMF also began developing educational piano publications during this period. Its first examination-board licences were for Trinity College London's 2015–2017 piano syllabus. Two works by Ben Crosland from the EMF collection Cool Beans! Vol. 2, The Swing Detectives and Cucumber Jam, were included in Trinity's examination publications.

The company subsequently expanded both its educational and concert-music catalogues. It relocated its operations to the United Kingdom, where Editions Musica Ferrum Ltd was incorporated in 2019.

== Publishing programme ==
Editions Musica Ferrum publishes contemporary solo and chamber music, with piano music forming a substantial part of its catalogue. Its publications range from advanced concert repertoire to music written for students and developing pianists.

The publisher has produced single-composer editions and collections alongside multi-composer anthologies. Its educational publications include the Mosaic series and collections such as Ben Crosland's Cool Beans! and Magic Beans!, Alison Mathews's Treasure Trove and Landscapes, and music by composers including Borislava Taneva, Simon Hester and Angeline Bell.

A recurring feature of EMF's publications has been an emphasis on the presentation of the printed score. Publications have incorporated artwork, illustrations and, in some cases, narrative elements alongside the music.

The catalogue has included composers at different stages of their careers. Reviewers have particularly noted the publisher's role in providing a platform for emerging composers.

EMF publications are distributed internationally through Hal Leonard.

== Critical reception ==
Editions Musica Ferrum and its publications have received sustained coverage in specialist piano publications since the mid-2010s.

A recurring subject in reviews has been the physical production of the company's scores as well as their musical content. Reviewers have commented on EMF's engraving, paper, artwork, book design and clarity of presentation. Writing in Pianodao in 2016, pianist and educator Andrew Eales identified the publisher's emphasis on high production standards as a distinguishing feature of the company, describing its scores as being aimed at the "quality end of the market" and frequently functioning as works of art in themselves.

International Piano also began reviewing EMF publications during the company's early years. In 2015, the magazine described Sideris's Fairyland in Treble, a collection of eleven piano duets, as a "quaint and charming anthology". Its review of Beauty & Hope in the 21st Century the following year described the publication as an "intriguing collection" of substantial piano works by nine living composers from around the world.

Subsequent specialist reviews have covered both EMF's concert and educational repertoire. International Piano has reviewed publications including Dusk of Day, Dawn of Night, James Welburn's Musical Escapades, volumes of the Mosaic series and Mehran Rouhani's Elegiac Dance.

Eales has reviewed EMF publications extensively for Pianodao. His reviews have repeatedly commented on the consistency of the publisher's production standards and the presentation of its scores. Reviewing Alison Mathews's Landscapes in 2019, he described EMF's catalogue as "tremendous and refreshing", praised the physical quality and clarity of the edition, and commended the publisher for providing a high-quality platform for emerging composers.

Educational repertoire has formed another recurring theme in critical coverage. Eales described Ben Crosland's Beans publications as an outstanding educational series, while subsequent reviews have highlighted the pedagogical writing of composers including Alison Mathews and Borislava Taneva.

== 250 Piano Pieces for Beethoven ==
In 2015, Editions Musica Ferrum began publishing the score edition of 250 Piano Pieces for Beethoven, an international composition project conceived and organised by Bonn-based pianist Susanne Kessel in preparation for the 250th anniversary of Ludwig van Beethoven's birth.

Beginning in 2013, Kessel commissioned composers from different countries, generations and musical backgrounds to write new short piano works connected with Beethoven, his music or his life. She premiered the compositions in public concerts, principally in Bonn, and recorded the works as the project developed.

Editions Musica Ferrum became the publishing partner for the complete score edition. Kessel and Sideris edited the volumes, which also included essays and analytical notes on the works by musicologist Rainer Nonnenmann.

The first volume, containing 25 compositions, appeared in 2015. It was reviewed in Neue Musikzeitung and entered the collection of Beethoven-Haus Bonn. Further volumes followed as the project expanded, and International Piano devoted a feature to the project in 2017, describing it as one of the most ambitious contemporary music projects of its time.

The project ultimately exceeded its original target. By its completion in Beethoven's anniversary year of 2020, 260 composers from 47 countries had contributed to the project. Editions Musica Ferrum published the complete collection of 260 works in ten volumes between 2015 and 2020.

The completed project received further coverage in the German music press and specialist piano publications. A subsequent publication, Selection of Easier Pieces, presented 18 more accessible works drawn from the ten-volume edition.

== Educational and examination repertoire ==
Educational music became an increasingly significant part of EMF's publishing programme during the 2010s.

The publisher's first examination-board licences were for Trinity College London's 2015–2017 piano syllabus, with two works by Ben Crosland from Cool Beans! Vol. 2 included in Trinity's examination publications.

EMF repertoire continued to appear in later Trinity syllabuses. The 2018–2020 syllabus included King for a Day! and Bendin' the Rules from Crosland's Magic Beans!. In Trinity's 2021–2023 examination publications, works by Crosland and Borislava Taneva were selected across several grades, including Bendin' the Rules, The Clown and the Ballerina and Balloons in the Air.

Works published by EMF subsequently appeared in graded repertoire selected by other examination boards, including London College of Music, the Associated Board of the Royal Schools of Music (ABRSM), and the Australian and New Zealand Cultural Arts examination board (ANZCA).

By the 2023–2024 ABRSM piano syllabus, works from several EMF collections were represented across multiple grades. Publications represented included Mosaic Vol. 1, Mosaic Vol. 2, Treasure Trove and Cool Beans! Vol. 1, with selected works by composers including Ben Crosland, Alison Mathews, Borislava Taneva and Sarah Konecsni.

EMF repertoire has continued to appear in subsequent examination syllabuses. More recent ANZCA piano syllabuses have included works by Angeline Bell alongside music by Alison Mathews.
