= Goblin Market and Other Poems =

Volume of poetry by Christina Rossetti

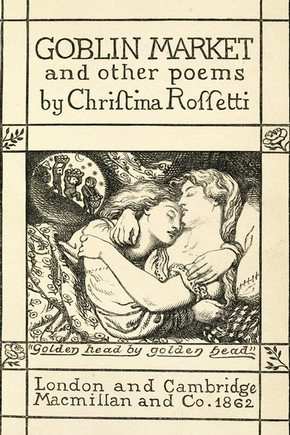
Illustration for the cover of Christina Rossetti's Goblin Market and Other Poems (1862), by her brother Dante Gabriel Rossetti

Goblin Market and Other Poems is English writer Christina Rossetti's first volume of poetry, published by Macmillan in 1862. It contains her famous poem "Goblin Market" and others such as "Up-hill", "The Convent Threshold", and "Maude Clare." It also includes the poem 'In the Round Tower at Jhansi, 8 June 1857', in which a British army officer takes his wife's life and his own so that they do not have to face death at the hands of the rebelling soldiers, commemorating the Jhokan Bagh massacre at Jhansi. Christina's brother, founding Pre-Raphaelite Brotherhood member Dante Gabriel Rossetti, designed the frontispiece and title page illustrations in the first edition, as well as the minimal blue binding. Christina was aware that her brother's "commercial savvy and artistic skill" helped make her first volume of poetry a success.

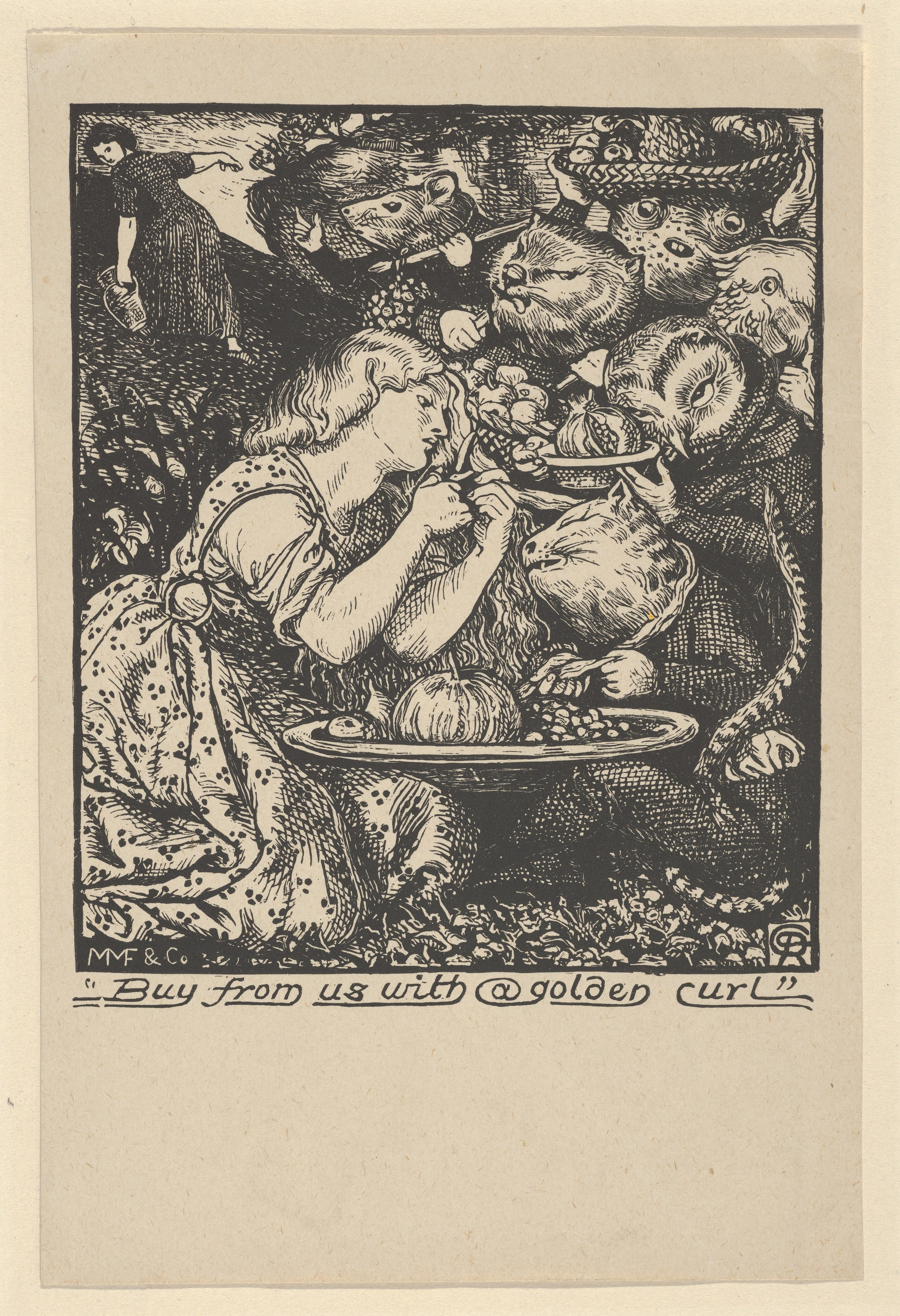
"Buy from Us a Golden Curl." Frontispiece to Goblin Market and Other Poems (1862)
