= Martin Ware =

British physician

Martin Ware (1915 – 23 September 1998) was a British physician. He was editor-in-chief of the British Medical Journal from 1966 to 1975.

After serving in the Royal Army Medical Corps, he passed the MRCP and joined the Medical Research Council as a publications officer. In 1950 he became assistant editor of the British Medical Journal, and in 1966 he succeeded Hugh Clegg as editor-in-chief.
