= Sarah Rees Brennan =

Irish writer

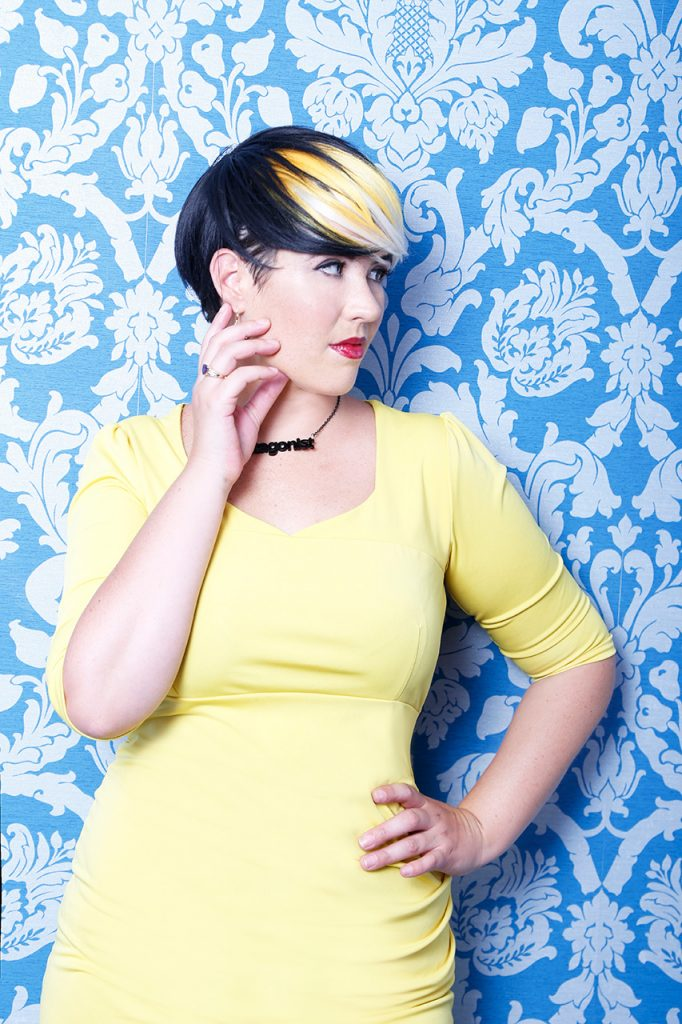
- Born: 21 September 1983 (age 43); Ireland
- Education: Kingston University London
- Occupation: Writer
- Writing career
- Period: 21st century
- Genres: Fantasy; young adult fiction
- Notable works: The Demon's Lexicon; In Other Lands; Long Live Evil
- Website: sarahreesbrennan.com

Sarah Rees Brennan (born 21 September 1983) is an Irish fantasy novelist. Her books have been bestsellers in both the UK and USA.

Rees Brennan's first novel, The Demon's Lexicon (2009), was longlisted for the 2010 Carnegie Medal. Her fantasy novel In Other Lands was a finalist for the 2017 Lodestar Award for Best Young Adult Book. Her adult fantasy novel Long Live Evil debuted on USA Today's bestseller list and became a #1 Sunday Times bestseller on release in the UK, and appeared on both The New York Times 2024 Best of Fantasy and Best of Romance lists. Rees Brennan's work was listed twice in the 2024 Locus Recommended Reading List: her Hansel and Gretel retelling "Happily Ever After Comes Round" was recommended in the Short Stories category and Long Live Evil was recommended in the Fantasy Novels category.

== Life and career ==
Rees Brennan was born in Ireland. She obtained a Creative Writing MA from Kingston University in London and worked in a library in Surrey, England, before moving to Dublin where she currently lives.

Rees Brennan has been writing since the age of five. She wrote fanfiction in her teens and twenties; in 2008, when she received her first book deal, her blog on LiveJournal had over 4000 subscribers.

She wrote her first novel, The Demon's Lexicon, while studying for her Creative Writing MA. The publishing house Simon & Schuster obtained a three-book contract deal with her which involved an undisclosed six-figure sum. Since then she has written and collaborated on many bestselling and award-nominated works, including In Other Lands and tie-in novels for Netflix shows. Rees Brennan's novel Long Live Evil debuted on the USA Today bestseller list and was a number one bestseller on the Sunday Times list in the UK.

Rees Brennan is a cancer survivor, having been diagnosed with stage 4 Hodgkin lymphoma in 2017.

In October 2025, Rees Brennan was a guest on the Off the Shelf podcast.

== Awards and honours ==
Three of Brennan's books have been Junior Library Guild books: Untold (2014), Unmade (2014), and In Other Lands (2017).

The Demon's Lexicon received starred reviews from Kirkus Reviews, Bulletin, and School Library Journal.

In 2017, The New York Times included In Other Lands on their list of the fall's best young adult fantasy novels.

Awards
Year	Title	Award	Category	Result	Ref.
2009	The Demon's Lexicon	Cybils Award	Young Adult Speculative	Finalist	
2010	The Demon's Lexicon	Leeds Book Award		Finalist	
2010	The Demon's Lexicon	ALA Best Fiction for Young Adults		Top 10	
2010	The Demon's Lexicon	Carnegie Medal		Longlisted	
2013	Unspoken	ALA Best Fiction for Young Adults		Selection	
2014	Team Human	Amazing Audiobooks for Young Adults		Selection	
2014	Unmade	Andre Norton Award		Finalist	
2017	In Other Lands	Bisexual Book Award	Teen/Young Adult Fiction	Won	
2017	In Other Lands	Goodreads Choice Award	Best Young Adult Fantasy & Science Fiction	Nominee	
2018	In Other Lands	European Science Fiction Society Award	Best Work of Fiction	Finalist	
2018	In Other Lands	Locus Award	Best Young Adult Book	Finalist	
2018	In Other Lands	Lodestar Award for Best Young Adult Book		Finalist	
2019	In Other Lands	ALA Rainbow Book List		Selection	
2019	In Other Lands	Mythopoeic Award	Adult Literature	Finalist	
2025	Long Live Evil	European SF Award	Best Written Work of Fiction	Won	

== Publications ==
=== Novels ===
==== Demon's Lexicon Trilogy ====
- The Demon's Lexicon, June 2009
- The Demon's Covenant, May 2010
- The Demon's Surrender, June 2011

==== Lynburn Legacy ====
- Unspoken, June 2012
- Untold, August 2013
- Unmade, 2014
- The Spring Before I Met You, September 2012 (novella)
- The Summer Before I Met You, September 2012 (novella)
- The Night After I Lost You (novella)

==== Shadowhunters Chronicles ====
- The Bane Chronicles (co-authored with Cassandra Clare and Maureen Johnson), November 2014
- Tales from the Shadowhunter Academy (co-authored with Cassandra Clare, Maureen Johnson, and Robin Wasserman) November 2016
- Ghosts of the Shadow Market (co-authored with Cassandra Clare, Maureen Johnson, Kelly Link, and Robin Wasserman), June 2019

==== Chilling Adventures of Sabrina ====
- Season of the Witch, July 2019
- Daughter of Chaos, December 2019
- Path of Night, May 2020

==== Fence novelisations ====
- Fence: Striking Distance, September 2020
- Fence: Disarmed, May 2021

==== Fate: The Winx Saga ====
- The Fairies' Path (as Ava Corrigan), March 2021
- Lighting the Fire, August 2022

==== Time of Iron ====
- Long Live Evil, August 2024
- All Hail Chaos, May 2026
- Kill Your Darlings, forthcoming

==== Stand-alone novels ====
- Team Human (co-authored with Justine Larbalestier), July 2012
- Tell the Wind and Fire, April 2016
- In Other Lands, August 2017

=== Short fiction ===
- "Undead Is Very Hot Right Now" in The Eternal Kiss, ed. Trisha Telep
- "The Spy Who Never Grew Up" in Kiss Me Deadly, ed. Trisha Telep
- "Queen of Atlantis" in Subterranean Press Magazine Summer 2011, ed. Gwenda Bond
- "Lets Get This Undead Show on the Road" in Enthralled: Paranormal Diversions, ed. Melissa Marr
- "Faint Heart" in After, eds. Ellen Datlow and Terri Windling
- "Treasure and Maidens" in Scheherazade's Facade, ed. Michael M. Jones
- "I Gave You My Love by the Light of The Moon" in Defy the Dark, ed. Saundra Mitchell
- "Beauty and the Chad" in Grim, ed. Christine Johnson
- "Wings in the Morning" in Monstrous Affections, ed. Kelly Link
- "Tears Waiting to Be Diamonds" in The Sunday Morning Transport
- "Happily Ever After Comes Round" in Uncanny Magazine May-June 2024, eds. Lynne M. Thomas and Michael Damian Thomas

=== Comics ===
==== Marvel Comics ====
- "Witch House" in Women of Marvel 2024 (art by Arielle Jovellanos and colors by Brittany Peer)
