= The Demon's Lexicon =

2009 book by Sarah Rees Brennan

- First edition
- Author: Sarah Rees Brennan
- Cover artist: Sam Hadley
- Language: English
- Series: The Demon Trilogy
- Genre: Novel
- Publisher: Simon & Schuster
- Publication date: 1 June 2009
- Publication place: Ireland
- Media type: Print (hardback and paperback)
- Pages: 330
- ISBN: 1-84738-289-4
- OCLC: 276818881
- Followed by: The Demon's Covenant

The Demon's Lexicon is a 2009 novel by the Irish author Sarah Rees Brennan. It was published worldwide by Simon & Schuster on June 1, 2009. It is the first in The Demon trilogy, the others being The Demon's Covenant (2010) and The Demon's Surrender (2011).

== Plot introduction ==
The story follows two brothers with a sordid past, Nick and Alan Ryves, who fight demons and monsters. They are on the run from a magician, from whom their mother supposedly stole an amulet, when they meet Mae and Jamie, troubled teenagers who come to them for help. Throughout the book they face horror, evil and people who just generally want to kill them, while long kept secrets are threatening to unravel. In the lore of the book, humans can either be born with magical powers, or can make pacts with demons who will grant them power or use their own magic. Very early on, Mae expresses the thought that she may have once had magical powers, but that they went away. Nick chastises her for this, saying that if you have magical powers, they never leave you.

== Character list ==
- Nick Ryves - Does not like anybody apart from his brother Alan, and cannot understand why Alan would endanger his life to help strangers.
- Alan Ryves - Nick's older brother, a redhead who wears glasses. He has a crippled leg, and is described as half Nick's size. While he is deadly with guns, he is also kind and always tries to help other people, notably Mae and Jamie.
- Mae Crawford - Considered by Nick and Alan to be annoying and loud, she is the big sister of Jamie Crawford. She has pink hair.
- Jamie Crawford - Mae's quiet brother. He is thin and nervous-looking, but kind. He makes jokes when he is nervous.
- Olivia - Nick and Alan's mother, Olivia is fond of Alan but hates Nick. She has mental problems and always wears charms, talismans and amulets.
- Merris Cromwell - The mysterious, unofficial leader of the Goblin Market. Very rich, she earns her money by running Mezentius House, a hospital/prison for bodies possessed by demons.
- Sin - A dancer at the Goblin Market.
- Black Arthur - A magician, leader of the Obsidian Circle. He is mean and power hungry, and would give up anything for power.
- Gerald - A magician in the Obsidian Circle.
- Anzu - A demon, who usually takes the form of an eagle.
- Liannan - An icy demon, succubus, who thinks that Nick is her past lover. She is commonly known as "Yuki Onna" in Japan. The reason is never given.

== Publication ==
The Demon's Lexicon was published worldwide on June 1, 2009. However, the book had an early Irish release, with Eason & Son stores selling the book as early as May 29.

== Awards and honors ==
The Demon's Lexicon received starred reviews from Kirkus Reviews, Bulletin, and School Library Journal.

Awards for The Demon's Lexicon
Year	Award	Result	Ref.
2009	Cybils Award for Young Adult Speculative	Finalist	
2010	ALA Best Fiction for Young Adults	Top 10	
2010	Carnegie Medal	Longlist	
	Leeds Book Award	Finalist	
