= 1518 (disambiguation) =

1518 was a common year starting on Friday of the Julian calendar.

1518 may also refer to:

- 1518!, a Japanese manga series by Yu Aida
- 1518 (album), a 2022 studio album by @onefive
- 1518 (number)
