= Bittersweet Fools =

2001 video game

- Windows box art featuring Tea and Alan
- Developer(s): Minori (Windows); HuneX (PS2, DC)
- Publisher(s): Minori (Windows); D3 Publisher (PS2, DC)
- Artist(s): Yu Aida
- Platform(s): Windows, Dreamcast, PlayStation 2
- Release: ^{JPN} August 31, 2001 (Windows)^{JPN} August 12, 2002 (PS2)^{JPN} August 29, 2002 (DC)
- Genre(s): Eroge (Windows version only), Visual novel
- Mode(s): Single-player

Screenshot of basic gameplay in Bittersweet Fools. Here, Alan and Solino are conversing.

Bittersweet Fools is a visual novel eroge developed by Minori. It was ported to the Dreamcast and PlayStation 2 with H-content removed as part of the Simple series line of "ren'ai adventure" games. It is vol.1 on the Dreamcast and vol.9 on the PS2.

The anime opening of the game was directed by Makoto Shinkai. The game takes place in Florence, Italy. The character design is by Yu Aida, whose Gunslinger Girl series also takes place in Italy.

== Characters ==
Alan (アラン, Aran)
The protagonist. A former mafia assassin.
Lenie (レーニエ, Rēnie)
Tea (ティ, Ti)
Voiced by: Miwa Kōduki
Siena (シエナ, Shiena)
Voiced by: Ruri Asano
Lepre (レプレ, Repure)
Francesca (フランチェスカ, Furanchesuka)
Yurn (ユーン, Yūn)
Solino (ソリノ, Sorino)
A flower shop girl that works near the apartment that Alan lives in.
Palermo (パレルモ, Parerumo)
His name is a pseudonym taken from the Italian city of Palermo.Voiced by: Kenji Hamada
Eliche (エリチェ, Eriche)
His name is a pseudonym derived from the Italian pasta eliche.
Voiced by: Keiji Okuda
Seth (セス, Sesu)
Sugar (シュガー, Shugā)
Moris (モーリス, Mōrisu)
A mysterious man.
