= Kine-san no Hitori de Cinema =

Japanese manga series

- First tankōbon volume cover, featuring Machiko Kine

木根さんの1人でキネマ (Kine-san no Hitori de Kinema)
- Genre: Comedy
- Manga
- Written by: Asai
- Published by: Hakusensha
- Imprint: Young Animal Comics (Note: The first volume was released under the Jets Comics imprint.)
- Magazine: Young Animal Densi (2015–2017); Manga Park (2017–present)
- Original run: April 17, 2015 – present
- Volumes: 12
- icon

Kine-san no Hitori de Cinema (木根さんの1人でキネマ, Kine-san no Hitori de Kinema; lit. 'Kine's One-Woman Cinema'), also known as I Love Cinema, I Am Lonely, is a Japanese web manga series written and illustrated by Asai. It was serialized in Hakusensha's Young Animal Densi website from April 2015 until May 2017, and later moved to Manga Park in August of that same year. Its chapters have been collected in 12 tankōbon volumes as of October 2026.

== Premise ==
The series follows Machiko Kine, a single office worker in her thirties, as she watches movies and shares her thoughts on them in her blog. Each chapter focuses on a different film, with Machiko humorously recounting her viewing experiences and personal reactions. Some episodes feature fictional movies that parody common cinematic tropes. The story revolves around her daily life, blending her passion for film.

== Publication ==
Written and illustrated by Asai, Kine-san no Hitori de Cinema was first published as a one-shot in Hakusensha's seinen manga magazine Young Animal on December 12, 2014. It started serialization on the Young Animal Densi website on April 17, 2015. The 22nd and last chapter published on Young Animal Densi was released on May 19, 2017, and the series resumed on Manga Park on August 4 of that same year. Hakusensha has collected its chapters into individual tankōbon volumes, with the first one released on December 25, 2015. As of October 29, 2026,12 volumes have been released.

=== Volumes ===
No.	Japanese release date	Japanese ISBN
1	December 25, 2015	978-4-592-14167-9
Chapter 1: "Terminator 3: Rise of the Machines" (ターミネーター3, Tāminētā 3); Chapter 2: "Bad Boys II" (バッドボーイズ2バッド, Baddo Bōizu 2 Baddo); Chapter 3: "Indiana Jones" (インディ・ジョーンズ, Indi Jōnzu); Chapter 4: "Star Wars" (スター・ウォーズ, Sutā Wōzu); Chapter 5: "Zombie Movies" (ゾンビ映画, Zonbi Eiga); Chapter 6: "Back to the Future" (バック・トゥ・ザ・フューチャー, Bakku tu za Fyūchā)
2	June 29, 2016	978-4-592-14168-6
Chapter 7: "Studio Ghibli Movies" (ジブリ映画, Jiburi Eiga); Chapter 8: "Love Actually" (ラブ・アクチュアリー, Rabu Akuchuarī); Chapter 9: "?????"; Chapter 10: "Titanic" (タイタニック, Taitanikku); Chapter 11: "Mad Max: Fury Road" (マッドマックス 怒りのデス・ロード, Maddo Makkusu Ikari no Desu Rōdo); Chapter 12: "The Hangover" (ハングオーバー! 消えた花ムコと史上最悪の二日酔い, Hanguōbā! Kieta Hana Muko to Shijō Saiaku no Futsukayoi)
3	January 27, 2017	978-4-592-14169-3
Chapter 13: "The Dark Knight and Superhero Movies" (ダークナイトとアメコミヒーロー映画, Daaku Naito to Amekomi Hiirō Eiga); Chapter 14: "Jaws" (ジョーズ, Jōzu); Chapter 15: "Summer Horror / Home Invasion Movies" (夏のホラー回 / ホーム・インベージョンムービー, Natsu no Horā Kai / Hōmu Inbējyon Mūbii); Chapter 16: "Fight Club" (ファイト・クラブ, Faito Kurabu); Chapter 17: "Neon Genesis Evangelion" (新世紀エヴァンゲリオン, Shinseiki Evangerion); Chapter 18: "Star Wars Episode V: Three Idiots Strike Back" (スター・ウォーズ回 エピソード5 / 3バカの逆襲, Sutā Wōzu Kai Episōdo 5 / 3 Baka no Gyakushū)
4	October 27, 2017	978-4-592-14170-9
Chapter 19: "The Exorcist" (エクソシスト, Ekusoshisuto); Chapter 20: "〇〇 Crisis Comedy" (〇〇の危機コメディ, ** no Kiki Komedi); Chapter 21: "Die Hard" (ダイ・ハード, Dai Hādo); Chapter 22: "Toy Story" (トイ・ストーリー, Toi Sutōrī); Chapter 23: "Rocky" (ロッキー, Rokkī); Extra: "The 40 Year Old Virgin" (40歳の童貞男, Yonjussai no Dōtei Otoko)
5	July 27, 2018	978-4-592-16225-4
Chapter 24: "My Fair Lady vs. The Karate Kid" (マイ・フェア・レディ vs ベスト・キッド, Mai Fea Redi vs Besuto Kiddo); Chapter 25: "Léon and the Director's Cut Edition" (レオンとディレクターズ・カット版, Reon to Direkutāzu Kattoban); Chapter 26: "The Graduate" (卒業, Sotsugyō); Chapter 27: "'007' Series" (「007」シリーズ, "007" Shirīzu); Chapter 28: "Baahubali: The Beginning" (バーフバリ 伝説誕生, Bāfubari Densetsu Tanjō); Chapter 28: "Baahubali: The Conclusion" (バーフバリ 王の凱旋, Bāfabari Ō no Gaisen); Special: "Academy Awards' Feature" (アカデミー賞特集, Akademī Shō Tokushu)
6	April 26, 2019	978-4-592-16226-1
Chapter 29: "Subtitles vs. Dubbed" (字幕VS吹き替え, Jimaku VS Fukikae); Chapter 30: "Your Name. / Horror vs. Animation" (君の名は。 ホラーvsアニメ, Kimi no Na wa Horā vs Anime); Chapter 31: "Jackie Movie" (ジャッキー映画, Jakkī Eiga); Chapter 32: "The Lord of the Rings Trilogy" (ロード・オブ・ザ・リング 3部作, Rōdo obu za Ringu Sanbusaku); Chapter 33: "The Matrix" (マトリックス, Matorikkusu)
7	February 28, 2020	978-4-592-16227-8
Chapter 34: "Sleepless in Seattle and Romantic Comedy" (めぐり逢えたらとロマンティック・コメディ, Meguri Aetara to Romantikku Komedi); Chapter 35: "Touching Movie" (泣ける映画, Nakeru Eiga); Chapter 36: "Alien vs. Predator and Crossover Movie" (エイリアンVSプレデターとクロスオーバー映画, Eirian VS Puredetā to Kurosuōbā Eiga); Chapter 37: "'Godzilla' Series" (「ゴジラ」シリーズ前編, "Gojira" Shirīzu Zenpen); Chapter 37: "'Godzilla' Series" (「ゴジラ」シリーズ後編, "Gojira" Shirīzu Kōhen)
8	December 25, 2020	978-4-592-16228-5
Chapter 38: "Pulp Fiction and Quentin Tarantino Movies" (パルプ・フィクションとクエンティン・タランティーノ監督作品, Parupu Fikushon to Kuentin Tarantīno Kantoku Sakuhin); Chapter 39: "Surprise Ending Movie" (どんでん返し映画, Donden Gaeshi Eiga); Chapter 40: "Star Wars Episode VI: Return of Four Idiots" (スター・ウォーズ回 エピソード6 / 4バカの帰還（前編）, Sutā Wōzu Kai Episōdo 6 / 4 Baka no Kikan (Zenpen)); Chapter 40: "Star Wars Episode VI: Return of Four Idiots" (スター・ウォーズ回 エピソード6 / 4バカの帰還 (後編), "Sutā Wōzu Kai Episōdo 6/4 Baka no Kikan (Kōhen)); Chapter 41: "Jurassic Park" (ジュラシック・パーク, "Jurashikku Pāku); Special: "The Incident of COVID-19" (コロナ事変, Korona Jihen)
9	December 24, 2021	978-4-592-16229-2
Chapter 42: "Trial Movie" (裁判映画, Saiban Eiga); Chapter 43: "'Gattaca' & Box Office of Movies" (ガタカと映画の興行収入, Gataka to Eiga no Kōkō Shūnyū); Chapter 44: "A Day When I Have a Lot of Movies I Want to See, but No Movies to See" (見たい映画がありすぎて見たい映画がない日, Mitai Eiga ga Ari Sugite Mitai Eiga ga Nai Hi); Chapter 45: "Evangelion 3.0 + Thrice Upon a Time" (シン・エヴァンゲリオン劇場版, Shin Evangerion Gekijōban); Chapter 46: "'Harry Potter' Series" (「ハリー・ポッター」シリーズ, "Harī Pottā" Shirīzu)
10	September 29, 2023	978-4-592-16230-8
Chapter 47: "The Game" (ゲーム, Gēmu); Chapter 48: "A Movie I Want to Erase My Memory and Watch Again" (記憶を消してもう一度見たい映画, Kioku o Keshite Mōichido Mitai Eiga); Chapter 49: "Top Gun: Maverick" (トップガン マーヴェリック, Toppu Gan Māverikku); Chapter 50: "A Movie Based on a Computer Game" (ゲーム原作映画（前編）, Gēmu Gensaku Eiga (Zenpen)); Chapter 50: "A Movie Based on a Computer Game" (ゲーム原作映画（後編）, Gēmu Gensaku Eiga (Kōhen))
11	July 29, 2025	978-4-592-16680-1
Chapter 51: "Battles Without Honor and Humanity" (仁義なき戦い, Jingi Naki Tatakai); Chapter 52: "Mobile Suit Gundam: Char's Counterattack" (機動戦士ガンダム 逆襲のシャア, Kidō Senshi Gandamu: Gyakushū no Sha); Chapter 53: "A Movie Where One Day Someone Close to You Suddenly Turns into a Different Person." (ある日突然身近な人が別人に変わってしまう映画, Aru Hi Totsuzen Midjikana Hito ga Betsujin ni Kawatte Shimau Eiga); Chapter 54: "Godzilla series Otara's Counterattack" (「ゴジラ」シリーズ オタラの逆襲, "Gojira" Shirīzu Otara no Gyakushū)
12	October 29, 2026	978-4-592-16724-2
