= Senko =

Senko, Senkō or Senkou may refer to:

== Places ==
- Senko, Mali a village and rural commune in the Cercle of Kita in the Kayes Region
- Senkō-ji (Onomichi) a historic Japanese temple
- Senkō-ji a Buddhist temple

== Songs ==
- "Senkō" (閃光 "flash of light"), a song by Japanese pop singer Tomiko Van
- "Senkou", a song by the Japanese rock band Alexandros
- "Senkō Shōjo", a song by the Japanese band Tokyo Jihen

== People ==
Name

- Mizuno Senko (1888–1919) Japanese writer novelist, story writer, essayist, and journalist

Surname

- Jen Senko (born 1954), American documentary filmmaker, author and truth-in-media activist
- Kyrylo Senko (born 2002) Ukrainian professional footballer
- Pavel Senko (1916–2000), a Russian explorer and scientist
- Valeriy Senko (born 1998) Belarusian professional footballer
- Vasily Senko (1921–1984) Soviet Air Force colonel and navigator
- Yuri Senko (born 1967) Belarusian politician
- Zsombor Senkó (born 2003) Hungarian professional footballer

== Characters ==
- Senko Amaguri in the manga Henjō: Hen na Joshikōsei Amaguri Senko
- Senko in the manga and anime series The Helpful Fox Senko-san

== Other uses ==
- Senkō (線香), Japanese incense
  - Senkō hanabi (線香花火), Japanese incense firework, sparkler
