= Kouji Mori =

Japanese manga artist

- 森恒二
- Born: November 28, 1966 (age 59); Tokyo, Japan
- Occupation: Manga artist
- Writing career
- Notable works: Holyland; Jisatsutō; Muhōtō; Sōsei no Taiga

Kouji Mori (Japanese: 森恒二, Hepburn: Kōji Mori; November 28, 1966) is a Japanese manga artist, best known for his works Holyland and Suicide Island. Mori was also notable as a close friend of Kentaro Miura, the author of Berserk. Upon Miura's death in 2021, Mori stepped forward to supervise the completion of Berserk.

== Early life and education ==
Mori was born on November 28, 1966, in Tokyo, Japan. Mori has been described as "mischievous" in his youth, being suspended for getting into fights. After graduating high school, Mori attended and graduated from the department of fine arts at Nihon University.

== Friendship with Kentaro Miura ==
Mori was a longtime friend of Miura, the two of them meeting in High School. Early on they co-authored a science fiction piece that was sent to Weekly Shōnen Sunday, but never ended up getting published. Miura has stated that Mori and his longtime friendship served as inspiration for Berserk, and particularly the relationship between Guts and Griffith.

Miura suddenly died in 2021 due to an acute aortic dissection at the age of 54, leaving fans uncertain as to whether Berserk would be finished. During this time, Mori stepped forward and offered to supervise the completion of the manga, as he is the only person Miura ever told the completed story to.

I have a message and promise to everyone. I will recall the details as much as possible and tell the story. Also, I will only write the episodes that Miura talked to me about. I will not flesh it out. I will not write episodes that I don't remember clearly. I will only write the lines and stories that Miura described to me. Of course, it will not be perfect. Still, I think I can almost tell the story that Miura wanted to tell.

— Kouji Mori

With the support of the publisher Hakusensha and Miura's assistants, Berserk has continued publication in Young Animal, with the first volume under his supervision (volume 42) being published September 29, 2023. Publication continued with volume 43 being released August 29, 2025.

== Works ==
- Holyland (2000–2008) – Serialized in Hakusensha's Young Animal.
- Suicide Island (2008–2016) – Serialized in Hakusensha's Young Animal.
- Muhōtō (2019–2022) – Serialized in Hakusensha's Young Animal.
- Destroy and Revolution (2010-2016) – Serialized in Shueisha's Weekly Young Jump.
- Sōsei no Taiga (2017–present) – Serialized in Kodansha's Evening (2017–2023), Hakusensha's Young Animal (2023) and Young Animal Zero (2023–present).
- D.Diver (2023–present) – Serialized in Hakusensha's Young Animal.
