= Himegasaki Sakurako Is a Hot Mess =

Japanese manga series

- First tankōbon volume cover, featuring Sakurako Himegasaki

姫ヶ崎櫻子は今日も不憫可愛い (Himegasaki Sakurako wa Kyō mo Fubin Kawaii)
- Genre: Romantic comedy
- Manga
- Written by: Kousuke Yasuda
- Published by: Media Factory
- English publisher: NA: Seven Seas Entertainment
- Imprint: MFC Cune Series
- Magazine: Comic Cune
- Original run: March 27, 2020 – present
- Volumes: 7

Himegasaki Sakurako Is a Hot Mess (姫ヶ崎櫻子は今日も不憫可愛い, Himegasaki Sakurako wa Kyō mo Fubin Kawaii) is a Japanese manga series written and illustrated by Kousuke Yasuda. It began serialization in Media Factory's Comic Cune magazine in March 2020, and has been compiled into seven tankōbon volumes as of March 2026.

== Plot ==
The series follows Sakurako Himegasaki, a classmate of her childhood friend Natsuki Mimori. She is in love with Natsuki and aims to catch his attention. However, due to her characteristics, such as being smart, beautiful, and a childhood friend, she becomes the designated "loser heroine". Their relationship is complicated when Setsuna Sasaki, a popular student in their school and Natsuki's relative, comes to live with him. The plot follows Sakurako as she repeatedly tries but often fails to overcome tropes associated with being a losing heroine.

== Characters ==
Sakurako Himegasaki (姫ヶ崎 櫻子, Himegasaki Sakurako)
Voiced by: Ayasa Itō (voice comic)
The title character and Natsuki's childhood friend. She is designated as a "losing heroine", thus following tropes and clichés associated with childhood friends in romcom series. She is in love with him and often tries to get his attention, only for her plans to often fail for circumstances beyond her control. Her fears are compounded when Setsuna appears and he develops an interest in her. She often gets into lewd or embarrassing situations. She and Natsuki later start dating after they mutually confess their feelings, although her fear of her being a "losing heroine" makes her remain fearful about her future.
Natsuki Mimori (三森 夏樹, Mimori Natsuki)
Sakurako's childhood friend. He lives with his aunt as his parents died in an accident when he was young. Although he develops an interest in Setsuna, he actually has feelings for Sakurako. The two start dating after they confess to each other.
Setsuna Sasaki (榊 雪菜, Sasaki Setsuna)
Voiced by: Kana Ichinose (voice comic)
A beautiful girl and Natsuki's relative whom he first encounters after he accidentally sees her panties while she is going up the stairs. She begins living with him, much to Sakurako's chagrin. She is a beautiful and popular student who is nicknamed "Ice Queen".
Honoka Ueda (上田 穂乃花, Ueda Honoka)
Sakurako's best friend, who is supportive about her love for Natsuki. She has a boyfriend.
Aki Amamiya (天宮 秋, Amamiya Aki)
Setsuna's friend and underclassman, who is in her third year of middle school and is the ace of her school's track and field club. She has a tomboyish personality.
Himeno Rurigaki (瑠璃垣 姫乃, Rurigaki Himeno)
The scion of the Rurigaki Group who lived most of her life overseas but moved to Japan in search of her sister. She transfers to Aki's school and becomes her classmate.

== Publication ==
The series is written and illustrated by Kousuke Yasuda. It began serialization in the May 2020 issue Media Factory's Comic Cune magazine, released on March 27, 2020. The first tankōbon volume was released on December 26, 2020. A voiced comic (voice comic) was released on Kadokawa's official YouTube channel on September 27, 2021, to commemorate the release of the series' second volume, with Ayasa Itō voicing Sakurako and Kana Ichinose voicing Setsuna. A second voice comic was posted on October 12, 2021. As of March 27, 2026, the series has been compiled into seven tankōbon volumes.

In November 2024, Seven Seas Entertainment announced that they had licensed the series for English publication beginning in June 2025.

=== Volumes ===
No.	Original release date	Original ISBN	English release date	English ISBN
1	December 26, 2020	978-4-04-065963-3	June 24, 2025	979-8-89373-417-1
Chapters 1–8
2	September 27, 2021	978-4-04-680637-6	September 30, 2025	979-8-89373-727-1
Chapters 9–16
3	November 26, 2022	978-4-04-681614-6	December 23, 2025	979-8-89373-728-8
Chapters 17–24
4	July 27, 2023	978-4-04-682591-9	April 7, 2026	979-8-89373-729-5
Chapters 25–32
5	June 27, 2024	978-4-04-683737-0	August 4, 2026	979-8-89561-357-3
Chapters 33–40
6	May 27, 2025	978-4-04-684793-5	December 15, 2026	979-8-89765-269-3
Chapters 41–48
7	March 26, 2026	978-4-04-685755-2	—	—
Chapters 49–56

== Reception ==
The series was recommended by the Tsutaya bookstore, praising its use of romantic comedy tropes about losing heroines in characterizing Sakurako.

== See also ==
- I Get the Feeling That Nobukuni-san Likes Me, another manga series by Kousuke Yasuda
