= Dungeon Master: Creating a Hot Spring Dungeon =

Japanese light novel series

- First light novel volume cover

異世界転生ダンジョンマスター 温泉ダンジョンを作る (Isekai Tensei Danjon Masutā: Onsen Danjon o Tsukuru)
- Genre: Fantasy, isekai
- Novel series
- Written by: Amahara
- Published by: Shōsetsuka ni Narō
- Original run: October 30, 2024 – present
- Light novel
- Written by: Amahara
- Illustrated by: Jun
- Published by: Fujimi Shobo
- English publisher: NA: Yen Press
- Imprint: Fujimi Fantasia Bunko
- Original run: August 20, 2025 – present
- Volumes: 4
- Manga
- Written by: Amahara
- Illustrated by: Aldehyde
- Published by: Fujimi Shobo
- Imprint: Dragon Comics Age
- Magazine: DraDra Sharp
- Original run: April 10, 2026 – present
- Volumes: 1

Dungeon Master: Creating a Hot Spring Dungeon (異世界転生ダンジョンマスター 温泉ダンジョンを作る, Isekai Tensei Danjon Masutā: Onsen Danjon o Tsukuru) is a Japanese light novel series written by Amahara and illustrated by Jun. It initially began serialization as a web novel published on Shōsetsuka ni Narō in October 2024. It later began publication under Fujimi Shobo's Fujimi Fantasia Bunko light novel imprint in August 2025. A manga adaptation illustrated by Aldehyde began serialization on Kadokawa's KadoComi and Nico Nico Seiga websites under Fujimi Shobo's DraDra Sharp brand in April 2026.

== Synopsis ==
As the protagonist lies down awaiting his eventual death from an incurable disease, he receives an encounter from supernatural entity named Peta-chan offering him a second chance at life in another world. However, it comes with a caveat where he is in charge of operating a dungeon owned by Peta. The protagonist known only as "Master" / "Sen" decides to operate the dungeon as a hot springs with a clearer focus on healing and strengthening clients. As the dungeon grows in popularity, unexpected phenomena begin to arise.

== Characters ==
Peta-chan (ペタちゃん)
Voiced by: Miyu Tomita (PV)

== Media ==
=== Light novel ===
Written by Amahara, Dungeon Master: Creating a Hot Spring Dungeon began serialization on Shōsetsuka ni Narō on October 30, 2024. It later began publication with illustrations by Jun under Fujimi Shobo's Fujimi Fantasia Bunko light novel imprint on August 20, 2025. Four volumes have been released as of October 20, 2026.

During its panel at New York Comic-Con 2026, Yen Press announced that it had licensed the series for English publication.

No.	Original release date	Original ISBN	North American release date	North American ISBN
1	August 20, 2025	978-4-04-075934-0	April 13, 2027	979-8-85-544375-2
2	December 19, 2025	978-4-04-075935-7	—	—
3	May 20, 2026	978-4-04-076329-3	—	—
4	October 20, 2026	978-4-04-076553-2	—	—

=== Manga ===
A manga adaptation illustrated by Aldehyde began serialization on Kadokawa's KadoComi and Nico Nico Seiga websites under Fujimi Shobo's DraDra Sharp brand on April 10, 2026. The manga's chapters have been compiled into a single tankōbon volume as of October 2026.

No.	Release date	ISBN
1	October 9, 2026	978-4-04-076592-1

=== Other ===
A promotional video was simultaneously uploaded to the Kadokawa Anime YouTube channel on the day of the first light novel volume's release. The video contained voiceover from Miyu Tomita.

== Reception ==
The series won the 2025 Next Light Novel Award in the bunkōbon category.

== See also ==
- 33-sai Dokushin Onna Kishi Taichō, a manga series written by Amahara
- The Idaten Deities Know Only Peace, a manga series written by Amahara
- Interspecies Reviewers, a manga series written by Amahara
