= Yu Aida =

Japanese manga artist and illustrator

- Born: November 8, 1977 (age 48); Tochigi Prefecture
- Education: Meiji University
- Occupation(s): Manga artist, illustrator
- Known for: Gunslinger Girl, Bittersweet Fools
- Website: www.remus.dti.ne.jp/~jewelbox/

Yu Aida (Japanese: 相田 裕, Hepburn: Aida Yū; born November 8, 1977) is a Japanese manga artist and illustrator, best known as the creator of Gunslinger Girl. Aida has also done the character designs for the eroge visual novel Bittersweet Fools.

== Works ==
- Bittersweet Fools (character designs)
- Gunslinger Girl (May 2002 – September 2012, Dengeki Daioh)
- 1518! (August 2014 – March 2019, Big Comic Spirits)
- The Valiant Must Fall (February 2021 – present, Young Animal)
