= Usotsuki Paradox =

Japanese manga series

- First tankōbon volume cover

うそつきパラドクス (Usotsuki Paradokusu)
- Genre: Romance
- Manga
- Written by: Nanki Satō
- Illustrated by: Akira Kiduki
- Published by: Hakusensha
- Imprint: Jets Comics
- Magazine: Young Animal
- Original run: April 10, 2009 – April 13, 2012
- Volumes: 9 + 1
- Live-action film
- Directed by: Kōta Yoshida
- Released: September 7, 2013
- icon

Usotsuki Paradox (Japanese: うそつきパラドクス, Hepburn: Usotsuki Paradokusu), also known by the short title Usopara (うそパラ), is a Japanese manga series written by Nanki Satō and illustrated by Akira Kiduki. It was serialized in Hakusensha's seinen manga magazine Young Animal from April 2009 to April 2012, with its chapters collected in ten tankōbon volumes (including an extra volume). It was adapted into a live action film, which premiered in September 2013.

== Plot ==
Shunsuke Yōkadō (八日堂 俊介, Yōkadō Shunsuke), a young salary man, is in love with Hinako Seiyū (栖佑 日菜子, Seiyū Hinako), an coworker of his. She is in a long-distance relationship with her boyfriend, but she agrees to go out with him on the condition they never have sex.

== Media ==
=== Manga ===
Written by Nanki Satō and illustrated by Akira Kiduki, Usotsuki Paradox was serialized in Hakusensha's seinen manga magazine Young Animal magazine, from April 10, 2009, to April 13, 2012. Hakusensha collected its chapters in nine tankōbon volumes, released under the Jet Comics imprint, between September 29, 2009, and June 26, 2012. A 10th volume with extra chapters, subtitled Jikangaiteate (時間外手当; lit. 'Overtime Pay') was published simultaneously with the ninth volume.

=== Live-action film ===
A live-action film adaptation, directed by Kōta Yoshida, premiered at the Human Trust Cinema in Shibuya on September 7, 2013. The lead characters Shunsuke Yōkadō and Hinako Seiyū are portrayed by Nami Motoyama and Akihiro Mayama respectively.

== See also ==
- Sex Nanka Kyōminai, another manga series by the same authors
- Boku wa Ikemen, another manga series by the same authors
