= Sōsei no Taiga =

Japanese manga series

- First tankōbon volume cover

創世のタイガ
- Genre: Science fiction; Survival
- Manga
- Written by: Kouji Mori
- Published by: Kodansha (part I); Hakusensha (part II)
- Imprint: Evening KC
- Magazine: Evening (2017–2023); Young Animal (2023); Young Animal Zero (2023–present)
- Original run: March 28, 2017 – present
- Volumes: 14
- icon

Sōsei no Taiga (Japanese: 創世のタイガ; lit. 'Taiga of Genesis') is a Japanese manga series written and illustrated by Kouji Mori. It was serialized in Kodansha's seinen manga magazine Evening from March 2017 to January 2023. A second part started in Hakusensha's Young Animal, where it ran from March to April 2023 and later moved to Young Animal Zero in May of the same year. As of April 2026, 14 volumes have been released.

== Publication ==
Sōsei no Taiga, written and illustrated by Kouji Mori, started in Kodansha's seinen manga magazine Evening from March 28, 2017, to January 24, 2023. Kodansha collected its chapters in eleven tankōbon volumes, released from August 23, 2017, to March 23, 2023.

A second part started in Hakusensha's seinen manga magazine Young Animal, where it ran from March 24 to April 28, 2023, and moved to Young Animal Zero on May 9 of the same year. Hakusensha republished the series' first eleven volumes digitally on June 29, 2023, and released the 12th volume in print on March 29, 2024. As of April 28, 2026, 14 volumes have been released.

=== Volumes ===
No.	Japanese release date	Japanese ISBN
1	August 23, 2017	978-4-06-354684-2
2	January 23, 2018	978-4-06-510792-8
3	June 22, 2018	978-4-06-511589-3
4	October 23, 2018	978-4-06-513092-6
5	May 23, 2019	978-4-06-515113-6
6	November 21, 2019	978-4-06-517589-7
7	September 11, 2020	978-4-06-520712-3
8	April 23, 2021	978-4-06-522991-0
9	December 23, 2021	978-4-06-526013-5
10	September 22, 2022	978-4-06-529583-0
11	March 23, 2023	978-4-06-531539-2
12	March 29, 2024	978-4-592-16022-9
13	March 28, 2025	978-4-592-16023-6
14	April 28, 2026	978-4-592-16029-8
