= The Valiant Must Fall =

Japanese manga series

- First tankōbon volume cover

勇気あるものより散れ (Yūki Aru Mono Yorichire)
- Genre: Action; Historical; Supernatural
- Manga
- Written by: Yu Aida
- Published by: Hakusensha
- English publisher: NA: Seven Seas Entertainment
- Imprint: Young Animal Comics
- Magazine: Young Animal
- Original run: February 26, 2021 – present
- Volumes: 9
- icon

The Valiant Must Fall (Japanese: 勇気あるものより散れ, Hepburn: Yūki Aru Mono Yorichire) is a Japanese manga series written and illustrated by Yu Aida. It has been serialized in Hakusensha's seinen manga magazine Young Animal since February 2021.

== Publication ==
Written and illustrated by Yu Aida, The Valiant Must Fall started in Hakusensha's seinen manga magazine Young Animal on February 26, 2021. Hakusensha has collected its chapters into individual tankōbon volumes. The first volume was released on August 27, 2021. As of July 29, 2026, nine volumes have been released.

In North America, the manga has been licensed for English release by Seven Seas Entertainment (originally announced under the title Die Even More Valiantly).

=== Volumes ===
No.	Original release date	Original ISBN	English release date	English ISBN
1	August 27, 2021	978-4-592-16681-8	March 28, 2023	978-1-68579-320-3
2	March 29, 2022	978-4-592-16682-5	August 29, 2023	978-1-68579-469-9
3	October 28, 2022	978-4-592-16683-2	October 1, 2024	979-8-88843-396-6
4	May 29, 2023	978-4-592-16684-9	February 25, 2025	979-8-89160-201-4
5	December 27, 2023	978-4-592-16685-6	September 23, 2025	979-8-89373-782-0
6	July 29, 2024	978-4-592-16686-3	February 17, 2026	979-8-89373-783-7
7	March 28, 2025	978-4-592-16687-0	August 18, 2026	979-8-89561-948-3
8	November 28, 2025	978-4-592-16688-7	January 26, 2027	979-8-89863-259-5
9	July 29, 2026	978-4-592-16699-3	—	—

== Reception ==
The manga received the Start Dash Award of Hakusensha's 2021 Denshi Shoseki Taishō (eBook Award), which went to the publisher's best-selling digital manga during the year. It was nominated for the 2022 Next Manga Award in the print category.
