= Sex Nanka Kyōminai =

Japanese manga series

- First tankōbon volume cover

セックスなんか興味ない (Sekkusu Nanka Kyōminai)
- Manga
- Written by: Nanki Satō
- Illustrated by: Akira Kiduki
- Published by: Shogakukan
- Imprint: Ikki Comix
- Magazine: Monthly Ikki
- Original run: March 25, 2009 – April 25, 2012
- Volumes: 4
- icon

Sex Nanka Kyōminai (Japanese: セックスなんか興味ない, Hepburn: Sekkusu Nanka Kyōminai; lit. 'I'm Not Interested in Sex or Anything Like That') is a Japanese anthology manga series written by Nanki Satō and illustrated by Akira Kiduki. It was serialized in Shogakukan's seinen manga magazine Monthly Ikki from March 2009 to April 2012, with its chapters collected in four tankōbon volumes.

== Overview ==
Sex Nanka Kyōminai is a short story collection depicting sexuality across a wide range of characters and circumstances. Each standalone story portrays a sexual or nonsexual encounter between two characters who share a particular relationship, such as estranged lovers, office colleagues, childhood friends, candidates for an arranged marriage, a caretaker and a patient, old acquaintances, beloved partners, and hated adversaries.

== Publication ==
Written by Nanki Satō and illustrated by Akira Kiduki, Sex Nanka Kyōminai was serialized in Shogakukan's seinen manga magazine Monthly Ikki from March 25, 2009, to April 25, 2012. Shogakukan collected its chapters in four tankōbon volumes, released from December 26, 2009, to June 29, 2012.

=== Volumes ===
No.	Japanese release date	Japanese ISBN
1	December 26, 2009	978-4-09-188493-0
2	September 30, 2010	978-4-09-188528-9
3	September 30, 2011	978-4-09-188559-3
4	June 29, 2012	978-4-09-188587-6

== See also ==
- Usotsuki Paradox, another manga series by the same authors
- Boku wa Ikemen, another manga series by the same authors
