= Gal Gohan =

Japanese manga series

- First tankōbon volume cover, featuring Miku Okazaki

ギャルごはん
- Genre: Gourmet; Romantic comedy; Slice of life
- Manga
- Written by: Marii Taiyou
- Published by: Hakusensha
- English publisher: NA: Seven Seas Entertainment
- Imprint: Young Animal Comics
- Magazine: Young Animal
- Original run: December 23, 2016 – March 27, 2020
- Volumes: 10

Gal Gohan (Japanese: ギャルごはん, Hepburn: Gyaru Gohan) is a Japanese manga series written and illustrated by Marii Taiyou. It was serialized in Hakusensha's seinen manga magazine Young Animal from December 2016 to March 2020, with its chapters collected in ten tankōbon volumes. In North America, the manga was licensed for English release by Seven Seas Entertainment.

== Premise ==
Home Economics teacher Shinji Yabe is asked to teach Miku Okazaki, the flashiest "gal" in their high school, to bake cookies in order to bribe her teachers from flunking her. With his encouragement, she eventually makes a successful batch. Shinji then starts a cooking club, but only Miku joins with some seemingly romantic intentions.

== Characters ==
Shinji Yabe (矢部 真司, Yabe Shinji)
A young high school Home Economics teacher. He worries that Miku might cross the line into a student-teacher romantic relationship. He starts a cooking club to try to increase his popularity among the high school students, but gets dismayed that Miku is the sole member.^{Vol. 1}
Miku Okazaki (岡崎 みく, Okazaki Miku)
The flashiest gal in school, she has blonde hair and a voluptuous body, and is proud of it. At the beginning of the series, she is failing every subject. After seeing that Shinji pays attention to her, she enjoys hanging out with "Yabecchi", and flirts with him, hoping he will fall in love with her.^{Vol. 1}
Makoto Ooishi (大石 真琴, Ōishi Makoto)
Miku's gal friend with the dark black hair.^{Vol. 1}
Hana Tsuburaya (円谷 花, Tsuburaya Hana)
Miku's gal friend with the brown hair and ponytail.^{Vol. 1}

== Publication ==
Written and illustrated by Marii Taiyou, Gal Gohan was serialized in Hakusensha's seinen manga magazine Young Animal from December 23, 2016, to March 27, 2020. Hakusensha collected its chapters in ten tankōbon volumes, released from June 29, 2017, to June 26, 2020.

In North America, the manga was licensed for English release by Seven Seas Entertainment.

=== Volumes ===
No.	Original release date	Original ISBN	English release date	English ISBN
1	June 29, 2017	978-4-592-16181-3	December 17, 2019	978-1-64505-174-9
2	October 27, 2017	978-4-592-16182-0	March 10, 2020	978-1-64505-215-9
3	February 28, 2018	978-4-592-16183-7	August 4, 2020	978-1-64505-473-3
4	June 29, 2018	978-4-592-16184-4	September 22, 2020	978-1-64505-735-2
5	October 29, 2018	978-4-592-16185-1	November 24, 2020	978-1-64505-806-9
6	February 28, 2019	978-4-592-16186-8	January 5, 2021	978-1-64505-964-6
7	June 28, 2019	978-4-592-16187-5	April 13, 2021	978-1-64827-096-3
8	October 29, 2019	978-4-592-16188-2	July 13, 2021	978-1-64827-255-4
9	February 28, 2020	978-4-592-16189-9	November 16, 2021	978-1-64827-326-1
10	June 26, 2020	978-4-592-16190-5	January 25, 2022	978-1-64827-379-7
