= 33-sai Dokushin Onna Kishi Taichō =

Japanese manga series

- First tankōbon volume cover

33歳独身女騎士隊長。
- Genre: Fantasy, sex comedy
- Manga
- Written by: Amahara
- Published by: Katts (online); Flex Comix (print)
- Imprint: Flex Comix
- Magazine: Ananga Ranga
- Original run: October 3, 2015 – present
- Volumes: 4
- Anime

33-sai Dokushin Onna Kishi Taichō (33歳独身女騎士隊長。; lit. '33 Years Old Single Girl Knight Captain') is a Japanese fantasy sex comedy manga series written and illustrated by Amahara. It has been serialized online in Katts' Ananga Ranga digital adult magazine since October 2015 and has been collected in four tankōbon volumes by Flex Comix as of January 2026. An anime adaptation has been announced.

== Plot ==
The small kingdom of Chronowork has only recently emerged from war. Mail, a female knight who serves as the captain of the princess's guard, is beautiful and holds a good position, but she is also unlucky in love and remains single at 33 years old. Despite being troubled by her homeland's lack of resources and tendency to solve everything with sheer manpower, Mail, who is essentially a workaholic, obediently follows the orders of the state, even while complaining to her second-in-command, Mena, and she carries out grueling missions without taking any days off.

== Characters ==
Mail (メイル, Meiru)
Mena (メナ)
Silvia (シルビア, Shirubia)

== Media ==
=== Manga ===
No.	Japanese release date	Japanese ISBN
1	November 12, 2018	978-4-8667-5038-5
2	January 12, 2021	978-4-8667-5136-8
3	July 12, 2023	978-4-8667-5298-3
4	January 15, 2026	978-4-8667-5481-9

=== Anime ===
An anime adaptation produced by Digital Shokunin was announced on November 6, 2026.

== See also ==
- Dungeon Master: Creating a Hot Spring Dungeon, a light novel series written by Amahara
- The Idaten Deities Know Only Peace, another manga series written by Amahara
- Interspecies Reviewers, another manga series written by Amahara
