= Holyland (manga) =

Japanese manga series by Kouji Mori

- First tankōbon volume cover

ホーリーランド (Hōrīrando)
- Genre: Martial arts
- Manga
- Written by: Kouji Mori
- Published by: Hakusensha
- Imprint: Jets Comics
- Magazine: Young Animal
- Original run: October 12, 2000 – May 23, 2008
- Volumes: 18
- icon

Holyland (Japanese: ホーリーランド, Hepburn: Hōrīrando) is a Japanese manga series written and illustrated by Kouji Mori. It was serialized in Hakusensha's seinen manga magazine Young Animal from October 2000 to May 2008, with its chapters collected in 18 tankōbon volumes.

== Plot ==
Yuu Kamishiro is a bullied high schooler who finds solace in the brutal world of street fighting. Training himself in martial arts, Yuu becomes a vigilante known as the "Thug Hunter", taking down bullies and delinquents who prey on the weak. However, as Yuu delves deeper into this violent underground world, he must confront the darkness within himself and find out what true strength means.

== Media ==
=== Manga ===
Holyland, written and illustrated by Kouji Mori, was serialized in Hakusensha's seinen manga magazine Young Animal from October 12, 2000, (Note: It debuted in the magazine's 20th issue of 2000, released on October 12 of the same year.) to May 23, 2008. Hakusensha collected its chapters in eighteen tankōbon volumes, released from June 29, 2001, to July 29, 2008.

==== Volumes ====
No.	Japanese release date	Japanese ISBN
1	June 29, 2001	978-4-592-13741-2
2	November 29, 2001	978-4-592-13742-9
3	April 26, 2002	978-4-592-13743-6
4	September 27, 2002	978-4-592-13744-3
5	March 28, 2003	978-4-592-13745-0
6	September 29, 2003	978-4-592-13746-7
7	February 27, 2004	978-4-592-13747-4
8	November 29, 2004	978-4-592-13748-1
9	March 29, 2005	978-4-592-13749-8
10	April 28, 2005	978-4-592-13750-4
11	October 28, 2005	978-4-592-14311-6
12	March 29, 2006	978-4-592-14312-3
13	August 29, 2006	978-4-592-14313-0
14	January 29, 2007	978-4-592-14314-7
15	June 29, 2007	978-4-592-14315-4
16	November 29, 2007	978-4-592-14316-1
17	April 28, 2008	978-4-592-14317-8
18	July 29, 2008	978-4-592-14318-5

=== Drama ===
Holyland was adapted into a 13-episode Japanese television drama, which was broadcast on TV Tokyo in 2005.

A 4-episode Korean television drama adaptation was broadcast on Super Action from April 28 to May 19, 2012.
