= I Get the Feeling That Nobukuni-san Likes Me =

Japanese manga series

- First tankōbon volume cover, featuring Nodoka Nobukuni

となりの信國さんは俺のことが好きな気がする (Tonari no Nobukuni-san wa Ore no Koto ga Suki na Ki ga Suru)
- Genre: Romantic comedy; Slice of life
- Manga
- Written by: Kousuke Yasuda
- Published by: Hakusensha
- English publisher: NA: Seven Seas Entertainment
- Imprint: Young Animal Comics
- Magazine: Young Animal
- Original run: September 25, 2020 – August 23, 2024
- Volumes: 7
- icon

I Get the Feeling That Nobukuni-san Likes Me (Japanese: となりの信國さんは俺のことが好きな気がする, Hepburn: Tonari no Nobukuni-san wa Ore no Koto ga Suki na Ki ga Suru) is a Japanese manga series written and illustrated by Kousuke Yasuda. It was serialized in Hakusensha's seinen manga magazine Young Animal from September 2020 to August 2024, with its chapters collected in seven tankōbon volumes.

== Plot ==
Nodoka Nobukuni is a high school student who was not interested in dating as she preferred to read books. This changed when she met Sasaki, a transfer student from Tokyo. Due to her inexperience, she turns to the advice written by a relationship guru named Meeko. A determined Nobukuni vows to make Sasaki fall in love with her.

== Publication ==
Written and illustrated by Kousuke Yasuda, I Get the Feeling That Nobukuni-san Likes Me serialized in Hakusensha's seinen manga magazine Young Animal from September 25, 2020, to August 23, 2024. Hakusensha collected its chapters in seven tankōbon volumes, released from April 28, 2021, to October 29, 2024.

In North America, the manga has been licensed for English release by Seven Seas Entertainment, with the first volume published on November 29, 2022.

=== Volumes ===
| No. | Original release date | Original ISBN | English release date | English ISBN |
|---|---|---|---|---|
| 1 | April 28, 2021 | 978-4-592-16641-2 | November 29, 2022 | 978-1-63858-555-8 |
1. "Charm Guys with Armpit Pheromones?!" (愛されフェロモンは脇の下から⁉, Aisare Feromon wa Wakinoshita Kara⁉); 2. "The Allure of a Sleeping Beauty?!" (男子は女子の寝顔にときめく⁉, Danshi wa Joshi no Negao ni Tokimeku⁉); 3. "What Boys Really Means When They Say You're Cute!" (男子の言う「可愛い」の本音は⁉, Danshi no Iu "Kawaii" no Honne wa⁉); 4. "Sniffing Out the Perfect Partner?!" (耳の裏の匂いで相性がわかる⁉, Mimi no Ura no Nioi de Aishō ga Wakaru⁉); 5. "Ten Tips for Flirting via LINE!" (LINEを使ったモテク10選, LINE o Tsukatta Moteku 10-sen); 6. "Using Study Sessions to Make Your Move!" (彼と勉強会で急接近のチャンス!, Kare to Benkyōkai de Kyū Sekkin no Chansu!); 7. "No Boy Can Resist the Seductive Lip Bite!" (男子ウケ抜群⁉ハムハムポーズのやり方, Danshi Uke Batsugun⁉ Hamu Hamu Pōzu no Yarikata); 8. "Give Yourself the Gift of Sexy Lingerie!" (勝負下着は自分をアゲる為に!!, Shōbu Shitagi wa Jibun o Ageru Tame ni!!); 9. "Get Closer by Walking Home Together?! (Part 1)" (仲良くなるには一緒に下校が一番⁉（前編）, Nakayoku Naruniha Issho ni Gekō ga Ichiban⁉ (Zenpen)); 10. "Get Closer by Walking Home Together?! (Part 2)" (仲良くなるには一緒に下校が一番⁉（後編）, Nakayoku Naruniha Issho ni Gekō ga Ichiban⁉ (Kōhen))
| 2 | October 29, 2021 | 978-4-592-16642-9 | March 14, 2023 | 978-1-63858-814-6 |
11. "Make Them Fall For You in Seven Seconds?!" (7秒間見つめ合えば両想いに!?, Nanabyō Kan Mitsume Aeba Ryō Omoi ni!?); 12. "Look 'Em in the Eye When You Say Hi!" (まずは目を見て挨拶から!!, Mazuwa Me o Mite Aisatsu Kara!!); 13. "Take Flirting to the Next Level with the Thigh Touch!" (あざとくたって効果テキメン!?太ももタッチ, Azatoku Tatte Kōka Tekimen!? Futomomo Tatchi); 14. "The Animal in You: What's Your Type?" (あなたは何タイプ!?動物タイプ診断, Anata wa Nan Taipu!? Dōbutsu Taipu Shindan); 15. "Guys Go for Girls Who Look Like Their First Crush?!" (男子は初恋の子の面影を求める!?, Danshi wa Hatsukoi no Ko no Omokage o Motomeru!?); 16. "Top Ten Tips for Flirting via LINE: Part 2" (続・LINEを使ったモテク10選, Zoku LINE o Tsukatta Moteku 10-sen); 17. "The Act of Adding Mystique ♥" (風を感じてミステリアスを演出♥, Kaze o Kanjite Misuteriasu o Enshutsu ♥); 18. "Get Your Foot in the Door of Love by Making Him Say Yes?!" (彼にYESと言わせるフット・イン・ザ・ドアとは!?, Kare ni YES to Iwaseru Futto in za Doa to wa!?); 19. "Even Failure Provides a Chance for Growth!! (Part 1)" (失敗してもいい!!成長のチャンス（前編）, Shippai Shite mo Ii!! Seichō no Chansu (Zenpen)); 20. "Even Failure Provides a Chance for Growth!! (Part 2)" (失敗してもいい!!成長のチャンス（後編）, Shippai Shite mo Ii!! Seichō no Chansu (Kōhen))
| 3 | May 27, 2022 | 978-4-592-16643-6 | July 11, 2023 | 978-1-68579-611-2 |
21. "How to Subtlety Tell Him You Like Him" (彼にそれとなく好意を伝える方法, Kare ni Soretonaku Kōi o Tsutaeru Hōhō); 22. "Play Up His Athletic Accomplishments!" (体育で活躍した彼を褒めよう!, Taiiku de Katsuyaku Shita Kare o Homeyou!); 23. "Get the Hot Summer Body of Your Dreams!!" (夏のダイエットを成功させよう!!, Natsu no Daietto o Seikō sa Seyou!!); 24. "Connect Through Common Interests!!" (彼と同じ趣味を始めて仲良くなろう!!, Kare to Onaji Shumi o Hajimete Nakayoku Narou!!); 25. "Tug on His Sleeve to Tug on His Heart!" (彼を呼びとめる時は袖をつかんで, Kare o Yobi Tomeru Toki wa Sode o Tsukande); 26. "The Trick to Indirectly Kissing Without Blushing ♥" (間接キスは赤面せずにさりげなく♥, Kansetsu Kisu wa Sekimen Sezu ni Sarigenaku ♥); 27. "Compliment Him by Focusing on You!" (男子は褒め言葉の「さしすせそ」に弱い⁉, Danshi wa Homekotoba no "Sashisuseso" ni Yowai⁉); 28. "Communication Is Key! (Part 1)" (自分の気持ちも伝えよう!（前編）, Jibun no Kimochi mo Tsutaeyou! (Zenpen)); 29. "Communication Is Key! (Part 2)" (自分の気持ちも伝えよう!（中編）, Jibun no Kimochi mo Tsutaeyou! (Chūhen))); 30. "Communication Is Key! (Part 3)" (自分の気持ちも伝えよう!（後編）, Nakayoku Jibun no Kimochi mo Tsutaeyou! (Kōhen))
| 4 | November 29, 2022 | 978-4-592-16644-3 | October 1, 2024 | 979-8-88843-127-6 |
31. "Failure Isn't an Option!! So, Don't Be Weird!" (失敗できない!!初デートは慎重に, Shippai Dekinai! ! Hatsu Dēto wa Shinchō ni); 32. "Working Up the Courage to Take the Next Step" (あと一歩を踏み出す勇気の出し方, Atoippo o Fumidasu Yūki no Dashikata); 33. "Guys Love a Natural Glow!" (男子ウケ一番はやっぱりナチュラルメイク!, Danji Uke Ichiban wa Yappari Nachuraru Meiku!); 34. "Use Travel Time to Get Closer!!" (移動時間を使って彼との距離を縮めよう!!, Idō Jikan o Tsukatte Kare to no Kyori o Chidjimeyou!!); 35. "Holding Hands Before You're Official: Yay or Nay?!" (付き合う前のデートで手を繋ぐのってアリ??, Tsukiau Mae no Dēto de te o Tsunagu no tte Ari??); 36. "Tips and Tricks to Holding His Hand" (彼と自然に手を繋ぐ方法, Kare to Shizen ni te o Tsunagu Hōhō); 37. "Use This Date to Plan the Next One!" (次のデートの約束はデート中に!, Tsugi no Dēto no Yakusoku wa Dētochū ni!); 38. "Drive Your Guy Wild with a Playful Touch!" (いたずらボディタッチで彼をキュンとさせよう!, Itazura Boditatchi de Kare o Kyunto sa Seyou!); 39. "I Don't Need a Crash Course on Love (Part 1)" (講座はいらない①, Kōza wa Iranai 1); 40. "I Don't Need a Crash Course on Love (Part 2)" (講座はいらない②, Kōza wa Iranai 2)
| 5 | June 29, 2023 | 978-4-592-16645-0 | December 31, 2024 | 979-8-88843-809-1 |
41. "I Don't Need a Crash Course on Love (Part 3)" (講座はいらない③, Kōza wa Iranai 3); 42. "I Don't Need a Crash Course on Love (Part 4)" (講座はいらない④, Kōza wa Iranai 4); 43. "I Don't Need a Crash Course on Love (Part 5)" (講座はいらない⑤, Kōza wa Iranai 5); 44. "I Don't Need a Crash Course on Love (Part 6)" (講座はいらない⑥, Kōza wa Iranai 6); 45. "I Don't Need a Crash Course on Love (Part 7)" (講座はいらない⑦, Kōza wa Iranai 7); 46. "Boys Love It When You Run Up to Them!" (小走りで駆け寄る仕草に男子はキュン!?, Kobashiri de Kakeyoru Shigusa ni Danshi wa Kyun!?); 47. "Choose Candid Over Campy When Posting Pics Online!!" (SNSでは盛れてない写真を選ぼう!!, SNS de wa Morete Nai Shashin o Erabou!!); 48. "How to Find Your Crush on Social Media" (気になるカレのSNSアカウントを見つける方法, Ki ni Naru Kare no SNS Akaunto o Mitsukeru Hōhō); 49. "Make Sure to Make Plans Before Summer Break Starts!!" (夏休みに入る前には遊ぶ約束を!!, Natsuyasumi ni Hairu Nae ni wa Asobu Yakusoku o!!); 50. "This Year's Swimsuit Guaranteed to Drive All the Guys Wild!!" (今年1番男子ウケするオススメ水着はコレ!!, Kotoshi Ichiban Danshi Uke Suru Osusume Mizugi wa Kore!!)
| 6 | February 29, 2024 | 978-4-592-16646-7 | April 15, 2025 | 979-8-89160-922-8 |
51. "Applying Sunscreen the Right Way" (正しい日焼け止めの塗り方, Tadashii Hiyakedome no Nurikata); 52. "Popularity Isn't Built in a Day!!" (モテは一日にしてならず!!, Mote wa Tsuitachi ni Shite Narazu!!); 53. "The Sometimes Devious(?!) Forbidden Temptress Trick" (時には打算的に!?禁断の小悪魔テク♡, Tokiniha Dasanteki ni!? Kindan no Shōakuma Teku ♡); 54. "Working with What You Got!!" (自分の強みを知って活かそう!!, Jibun no Tsuyomi o Shitte Ikasou!!); 55. "He'll Only Have Eyes for You with This Playful Beach Move (Part 1)" (海ではしゃいで彼の視線を独り占め♡前編, Umi de Hashaide Kare no Shisen o Hitorijime ♡ Zenpen); 56. "He'll Only Have Eyes for You with This Playful Beach Move (Part 2)" (海ではしゃいで彼の視線を独り占め♡後編, Umi de Hashaide Kare no Shisen o Hitorijime ♡ Kōhen); 57. "Must-Do at the Beach! The Selfie" (海で絶対したい!一緒に自撮り, Umi de Zettai Shitai! Issho ni Jidori); 58. "A Text Invitation He Can't Refuse" (LI●Eで断られないデートの誘い方, LI ● E de Kotowara Renai Dēto no Sasoikata); 59. "My Best Friend Next Door (Part 1)" (となりの幼馴染み①, Tonari no Osananajimi 1); 60. "My Best Friend Next Door (Part 2)" (となりの幼馴染み②, Tonari no Osananajimi 2)
| 7 | October 29, 2024 | 978-4-592-16647-4 | September 16, 2025 | 979-8-89561-180-7 |
61. "My Best Friend Next Door (Part 3)" (となりの幼馴染み③, Tonari no Osananajimi 3); 62. "My Best Friend Next Door (Part 4)" (となりの幼馴染み④, Tonari no Osananajimi 4); 63. "The Key to a Successful Confession is to Be Prepared" (失敗しない為の告白の心構え, Shippai Shinai Tame no Kokuhaku no Kokorogamae); 64. "Stay Objective!" (客観的な視点を取り入れよう!, Kakkantekina Shiten o Toriireyō!); 65. "A Successful Confession Comes Down to Planning!! (Part 1)" (告白の成功は準備の仕方で決まる!! 前編, Kokuhaku no Seikō wa Junbi no Shikata de Kimaru!! Zenpen); 66. "A Successful Confession Comes Down to Planning!! (Part 2)" (告白の成功は準備の仕方で決まる!! 後編, Kokuhaku no Seikō wa Junbi no Shikata de Kimaru!! Kōhen); 67. "The Love Guru's Secret to Popularity" (海人生の先輩から学ぶモテの秘訣, Jinsei no Senpai Kara Manabu Mote no Hiketsu); 68. "A Little Creativity Makes a Memorable Confession!!" (ひと工夫で思い出に残る告白に!!, Hito Kufū de Omoide ni Nokoru Kokuhaku ni!!); 69. "The Key to a Successful Confession is to Be Prepared - Cont." (続・失敗しない為の告白の心構え, Zoku Shippai Shinai Tame no Kokuhaku no Kokorogamae); 70. "100 Ways to Get Your Classmate to Fall for You ♥" (まだまだある!隣りの席の好きなひとと仲良くなる方法100選♡, Mada Mada Aru! Tannari no Seki no Sukina Hito to Nakayoku Naru Hōhō 100-sen ♡)

== See also ==
- Himegasaki Sakurako Is a Hot Mess, another manga series by Kousuke Yasuda
