= Destroy and Revolution =

Japanese manga series

- First tankōbon volume cover

デストロイ アンド レボリューション (Desutoroi ando Reboryūshon)
- Genre: Science fiction
- Manga
- Written by: Kouji Mori
- Published by: Shueisha
- Imprint: Young Jump Comics
- Magazine: Weekly Young Jump
- Original run: October 21, 2010 – October 27, 2016
- Volumes: 9
- icon

Destroy and Revolution (Japanese: デストロイ アンド レボリューション, Hepburn: Desutoroi ando Reboryūshon) is a Japanese manga series written and illustrated by Kouji Mori. It was serialized in Shueisha's seinen manga magazine Weekly Young Jump from October 2010 to October 2016, with its chapters collected in nine tankōbon volumes.

== Plot ==
Makoto Tanaka, a withdrawn high school student, has lived a lonely life after losing his parents. He is bullied and repeats grades, isolating himself while hiding a dangerous supernatural ability, which allows him to remotely destroy matter from a distance. After the death of his grandmother, his last remaining family member, Makoto is left completely alone and emotionally adrift. Around this time, he is approached by Yuuki, a charismatic and highly intelligent classmate who quickly deduces the existence of Makoto's power.

Yuuki reveals his ambition to dismantle and rebuild society, believing that the current social order is fundamentally corrupt. Recognizing that Makoto's destructive ability could make this possible, Yuuki persuades him to join his cause, and together they form a terrorist organization to combat the government. As Makoto becomes increasingly involved in Yuuki's plans, he is forced to confront the consequences of using his power for large-scale destruction.

== Publication ==
Written and illustrated by Kouji Mori, Destroy and Revolution was serialized in Shueisha's seinen manga magazine Weekly Young Jump from October 21, 2010, to October 27, 2016. Shueisha collected its chapters in nine tankōbon volumes, released from April 28, 2011, to January 19, 2017.

=== Volumes ===
No.	Japanese release date	Japanese ISBN
1	April 28, 2011	978-4-088-79135-7
2	December 19, 2011	978-4-088-79237-8
3	September 28, 2012	978-4-088-79394-8
4	May 29, 2013	978-4-088-79548-5
5	December 19, 2013	978-4-08-879723-6
6	July 18, 2014	978-4-08-879872-1
7	July 17, 2015	978-4-08-890231-9
8	June 17, 2016	978-4-08-890388-0
9	January 19, 2017	978-4-08-890652-2
