= D.Diver =

Japanese manga series by Kouji Mori

- First tankōbon volume cover, featuring Kagura Wataru (front) and Kagura Wataru in his dream state (back)

D.ダイバー (Di Daibā)
- Genre: Mystery; Supernatural
- Manga
- Written by: Kouji Mori
- Published by: Hakusensha
- Imprint: Young Animal Comics
- Magazine: Young Animal
- Original run: May 26, 2023 – present
- Volumes: 6
- icon

D.Diver (Japanese: D.ダイバー, Hepburn: Di Daibā) is a Japanese manga series written and illustrated by Kouji Mori, following Kagura Wataru as he disocovers he has "dream-diving" powers. It has been serialized in Hakusensha's seinen manga magazine Young Animal since May 2023, with its chapters collected into six tankōbon volumes as of September 2026.

== Plot ==
Kagura Wataru lost his parents when he was a child after someone set their house on fire. Now he is a university student studying law, until one day he starts having strange dreams. These dreams are unusually vivid and blur the line between dream and reality. As he advances in his criminal law studies and confronts real-world evil, these dreams grow more intense. One day after dozing off during a trial seminar, he realizes that the actions he takes within his dreams have consequences in the real world. This revelation leads him to adopt the role of a "dark hero", using his dream-diving ability to fight and punish wrongdoers who escape justice in the waking world.

== Publication ==
D.Diver is written and illustrated by Kouji Mori, and has been serialized in Hakusensha's seinen manga magazine Young Animal since May 26, 2023. The manga's chapters have been collected in six tankōbon volumes as of September 2026.

=== Volumes ===
| No. | Japanese release date | Japanese ISBN |
|---|---|---|
| 1 | November 29, 2023 | 978-4-592-16666-5 |
| 2 | June 28, 2024 | 978-4-592-16667-2 |
| 3 | March 28, 2025 | 978-4-592-16668-9 |
| 4 | August 29, 2025 | 978-4-592-16669-6 |
| 5 | March 27, 2026 | 978-4-592-16670-2 |
| 6 | September 29, 2026 | 978-4-592-16714-3 |
