= Boku wa Ikemen =

Japanese manga series

- First tankōbon volume cover

ボクはイケメン
- Genre: Romantic comedy
- Manga
- Written by: Nanki Satō
- Illustrated by: Akira Kiduki
- Published by: Hakusensha
- Imprint: Young Animal Comics
- Magazine: Young Animal
- Original run: November 25, 2016 – April 27, 2018
- Volumes: 4

Boku wa Ikemen (ボクはイケメン; "I'm Handsome") is a Japanese manga series written by Nanki Satō and illustrated by Akira Kiduki. It was serialized in Hakusensha's seinen manga magazine Young Animal from November 2016 to April 2018, with its chapters collected in four tankōbon volumes.

== Publication ==
Written by Nanki Satō and illustrated by Akira Kiduki, Boku wa Ikemen was serialized in Hakusensha's seinen manga magazine Young Animal from November 25, 2016, to April 27, 2018. Hakusensha collected its chapters in four tankōbon volumes, released from June 29, 2017, to June 29, 2018.

=== Volumes ===
No.	Japanese release date	Japanese ISBN
1	June 29, 2017	978-4-592-16141-7
2	October 27, 2017	978-4-592-16142-4
3	February 28, 2018	978-4-592-16143-1
4	June 29, 2018	978-4-592-16144-8

== See also ==
- Sex Nanka Kyōminai, another manga series by the same authors
- Usotsuki Paradox, another manga series by the same authors
