= The Idaten Deities Know Only Peace =

Japanese manga series

- First tankōbon volume cover of the manga remake, featuring (from left to right) Paula, Hayato, Ysley, and Obami (top right)

平穏世代の韋駄天達 (Heion Sedai no Idaten-tachi)
- Genre: Action; Dark fantasy; Science fiction
- Manga

Web manga
- Written by: Amahara
- Published by: Neetsha
- Original run: 2008 – 2016
- Manga

Remake
- Written by: Amahara
- Illustrated by: Coolkyousinnjya
- Published by: Hakusensha
- English publisher: NA: Seven Seas Entertainment
- Magazine: Young Animal
- Original run: August 24, 2018 – August 9, 2024
- Volumes: 9
- Anime television series
- Directed by: Seimei Kidokoro
- Produced by: Shigetoshi Satou; Makoto Kimura; Taku Matsuo; Yoshinori Takeda
- Written by: Hiroshi Seko
- Music by: Yoshiaki Dewa
- Studio: MAPPA
- Licensed by: Crunchyroll: SA/SEA: Medialink
- Original network: Fuji TV (Noitamina)
- Original run: July 23, 2021 – October 1, 2021
- Episodes: 11
- icon

The Idaten Deities Know Only Peace (Japanese: 平穏世代の韋駄天達, Hepburn: Heion Sedai no Idaten-tachi) is a Japanese manga series written by Amahara and illustrated by Coolkyousinnjya. It was serialized in Hakusensha's seinen manga magazine Young Animal from August 2018 to August 2024, with its chapters collected in nine tankōbon volumes. It is a remake of Amahara's online manga series The Idaten Deities Know Only Peace, which he started in 2008 and stopped updating in 2016. An 11-episode anime television series adaptation by MAPPA aired from July to October 2021 on Fuji TV's Noitamina programming block.

== Plot ==
About 800 years ago, monstrous demons attacked and threatened mankind's existence; while at risk of being extinct, all the humans began praying to their respective gods, hoping for someone or something to save every one from the brink of destruction. With their prayers answered, a race of deities called the "Idaten" were created; by using their utmost endurance and powerful god-like abilities the Idaten managed to defeat the demons, saving humanity and bringing peace to the entire world. Now in the present time, the newer generation of the Idaten know little about the demons since they have all lived peaceful lives. Training under Rin, the only remaining original Idaten from 800 years ago, the new Idaten find ways to survive in a time where they have seemingly outlived their usefulness. Suddenly, when the tyrannical Zoble Empire resurrects a demon, the misfit warriors are called to the battlefield against their natural enemy once more.

== Characters ==
=== Idaten ===
Hayato (ハヤト)
Voiced by: Romi Park
Hayato is a deity in the form of a youth. He was created by Rin 80 years ago and is part of the "Peace Generation" that did not experience the war 800 years prior. He is fiercely competitive, single-minded, and obsessed with self-improvement. Among his peers, he boasts the highest combat prowess and relentless dedication to training. He cares little for the sealed demon race or any duty to destroy them. He disrespectfully calls Rin "old hag", but respects her strength and endures her brutal training without retreating. Unlike other deities, he seeks power purely for its own sake, displaying immense potential. After defeating the revived giant demon Gyudo in the glacial region, he continues battling the Zoble Empire's demons while refining his skills, even mastering weight control. His rapid growth astonishes allies like Prontea.
Ysley (イースリイ, Īsurii)
Voiced by: Megumi Ogata
Ysley is a deity who manifested naturally 100 years ago, appearing as a bespectacled youth with black hair. A scholarly member of the "Peace Generation", he prioritizes research over combat. After enduring only three months of Rin's brutal training, he avoided her for fifty years before reluctantly returning to improve his skills. Ysley researches divine origins and conducts controversial experiments, including neural modifications on captured demons. He played a key role in founding the nation of Hotaina, where he directs a major research facility. Though physically weaker than combat-focused deities, he compensates with brilliant tactics and his unique ability to generate surgical scalpels from his right hand.
Paula (ポーラ, Pōra)
Voiced by: Yui Horie
Paula is a deity who typically manifests as a young girl with blonde twin-tails, dressed in a white blouse and long skirt. Prontea's unique appearance combines childlike features with a mature physique, creating a distinctive aesthetic. As the youngest of her generation, she prefers peaceful coexistence with birds over combat, exhibiting a cheerful and gentle personality. She is skilled in silent movement, but is still gaining experience in battle. Following a period of introspection, she decides to collaborate with Ysley on Rin's intensive training programme. She regularly accompanies Ysley and is well-versed in his temperament.
Rin (リン)
Voiced by: Akemi Okamura
Rin is a formidable deity who manifests as a young woman with an orange ponytail, attired in Chinese-style clothing. Despite her petite stature, she has an impressive combat ability. Having witnessed a great battle 800 years ago, she spent centuries in training. She acts as a mentor to younger deities such as Hayato, though her training methods are harsh and brutal. Rin is dedicated to protecting the demons' sealed location and eradicating them with a strong sense of duty. She typically engages in hand-to-hand combat, but can also wield a greatsword in her right hand.
Prontea (プロンテア, Purontea)
Voiced by: Akira Ishida
Prontea emerges as a pivotal figure in the face of demonic manipulation of humanity, inciting war through the Zoble Empire. Facing Rin's overwhelming power—the strongest deity from 800 years ago—the demon leader Over M orders his generals to eliminate younger deities before they mature. Rin is preparing to destroy Zoble, and has enlisted Prontea's assistance. Meanwhile, Ysley investigates mysterious humanoid demons while Hayato and Paula train under Prontea, soon confronting demon assassins Neput and Cory. The conflict intensifies, leading to a fierce battle of intellect and power between deities and demons.
Gill (ギル, Giru)
Voiced by: Shizuka Itō
Gill is a deity that has been manifested from condensed human consciousness within the Zoble Empire. Her form and nature were shaped by the intense protective devotion of Sister Gillltina (ギルティーナ, Girutīna) at the moment of creation, necessitating immediate combat training. She is unusually proficient with modern technology, such as smartphones, which she stores in metal containers during training to prevent damage. However, Miku's assessment is that her absolute commitment to pure goodness renders her ineffective in practical situations.

=== Demons ===
Obami (オオバミ, Ōbami) / Demon King Over-M (魔王オーバーM, Maō Ōbā Emu)
Voiced by: Chō
Demon King Over-M, the demon king leading Zoble's forces under the alias Dr. Obami, uses frozen remains to revive demons, creating humanoid "C-Soldiers". According to Ysley's theory, the fragmented nature of his memories suggests a hybrid origin from the ancient deity-demon war. Formerly posing as Emperor Obama, he now manipulates Zoble to exterminate deities while concealing his true nature, even from himself.
Piscalat (ピサラ, Pisara)
Voiced by: Asami Seto
Piscalat is a high-ranking Zoble Empire military commander who appears as a popular young woman. She is secretly a humanoid demon, but despite her cool demeanour, she displays unexpected shyness regarding romantic matters. This earns her teasing from Mik and exemption from reproductive missions. As a field commander, she leads invasion forces with superhuman strength, and manipulates her extendable hair as both weapon and trap. Sent to assassinate Ysley, she is outmaneuvered psychologically when he exploits her prudishness. Though spared, she undergoes neural reconstruction along with allies Neput and Cory, becoming an unwilling informant on demonic forces while assisting Hayato's training.
Nickel (ニッケル, Nikkeru)
Voiced by: Sumire Uesaka
Nickel is a humanoid demon and the Zoble Empire's chief guard captain. He appears as a blonde-haired boy with narrow eyes. Despite his youthful appearance, he possesses the highest combat ability among demons. He was deployed as the primary assassin against the deities, achieving a victory over Hayato but ultimately succumbing to Rin's attack. His remains are later taken to Ysley's laboratory for research.
Cory (コリー, Korī)
Voiced by: Shizuka Ishigami
Cory is a young soldier in the Zoble Imperial Army and Piscalat's younger brother. He appears as a small-statured boy with short blonde hair. In contrast to the typical demon, he retains a degree of sensitivity and a particular affinity for seafood. In battle, he is only able to transform his head. He was deployed as part of an assassination team against the deities, but was defeated by Hayato. He was then under the care of Ysley, who performed a neural reconstruction procedure on him.
Neput (ネプト, Neputo)
Voiced by: Masuo Amada
Neput is a humanoid demon serving as the Zoble Empire's naval admiral. He appears as a rugged, one-eyed military officer with an eyepatch. Despite his unconventional background, he has demonstrated a level of rationality that is noteworthy. His primary ability allows full-body transformation into monstrous forms, though this offers little combat advantage. He was deployed as part of an assassination squad against the deities, but was defeated by Prontea and underwent Ysley's neural reconstruction. Although he is officially listed as 50 years old, he is actually over 80, making him contemporary with Takeshita.
Miku (ミク)
Voiced by: Mariya Ise
Miku is a demon who serves as a conditioning specialist for the Zoble Empire. She appears as a dark-skinned woman with twin-tails, typically wearing revealing bondage outfits. Her primary role involves training enslaved women for demon reproduction purposes. While lacking combat prowess, Miku possesses exceptional analytical abilities. She studies footage of deity battles, demonstrating keen strategic insight. However, her hedonistic personality and extreme conditioning methods draw disapproval from colleagues. After concluding the Empire cannot defeat the deities, Miku flees with two fellow demons and two infant demons. Her unorthodox erotic training techniques remain controversial, though her tactical intellect is widely acknowledged.
Brandy (ブランディ, Burandi)
Voiced by: Yōko Honna
The Zoble Empire's demonic empress, Brandy, is depicted as a fully grown redhead woman. Despite her combat strength being on par with Nickel's, she experiences a sense of trepidation towards the deities following her observation of Nickel's swift defeat at the hands of Rin. In an unconscious act of devotion to her children, she discreetly arranges for three of them to be sent away upon perceiving an imminent threat. Her abilities include manipulating her extendable hair as weapons/traps and controlling connected dolls/corpses. Despite her desire to flee, her strong sense of responsibility keeps her in Zoble, where she ultimately confronts Rin in the city streets.
Takeshita (タケシタ)
Voiced by: Mitsuru Miyamoto
Takeshita, the emperor of the Zoble Empire and husband to Brandy, appears as an unremarkable middle-aged man, but he is in fact one of the most powerful humanoid demons. While he lacks the transformative abilities of other demons, he compensates for this with exceptional hand-to-hand combat skills. During the deities' assault on Zoble, he confronts Hayato in the underground slave prison.
Kuraichi (クライシ), Buzz (バズ, Bazu), and Raki (ラキ)
Voiced by: Ryōhei Kimura (Kuraichi),^{Ep. 6 credits} Ayaka Fukuhara (Buzz),^{Ep. 6 credits} and Yui Makino (Raki)^{Ep. 6 credits}
Prince Kuraichi, Prince Buzz and Princess Raki are the children of the Zoble Empire's imperial family. Though there are numerous imperial successors, they are the only direct descendants of Takeshita and Brandy. Possessing low demonic abilities, they are deemed non-combatants and are evacuated abroad on Brandy's sole authority. Each participant selects a demon to accompany them: Kuraichi opts for Ferlandia, Buzz selects Major Meliano, and Raki chooses the royal butler, Croft. Years later, Buzz and Meliano are executed upon returning to Zoble after failing to control their newborn child. Kuraichi, a tactically intelligent but average combatant, later allies with the Demon King and kidnaps Ysley and Paula. He is eventually killed by researchers who had transplanted demon cells. Raki and Croft live in seclusion, discarding their offspring into the sea until they are discovered by Miku and the Demon King, who install them as the figurehead royalty of the new nation, Cortecle (コーテクル, Kōtekuru).

== Media ==
=== Manga ===
Amahara started The Idaten Deities Know Only Peace as a webcomic on Neetsha in 2008; it stopped publication after its 28th chapter, published on May 27, 2016. The manga remake by Coolkyousinnjya started in Hakusensha's seinen manga magazine Young Animal on August 24, 2018. The manga remake caught up with the webcomic, and a completely new chapter was published on April 14, 2023. It finished on August 9, 2024. Hakusensha collected its chapters in nine tankōbon volumes, released from January 29, 2019, to October 29, 2024.

The manga has been licensed in English by Seven Seas Entertainment.

==== Volumes ====
| No. | Original release date | Original ISBN | English release date | English ISBN |
|---|---|---|---|---|
| 1 | January 29, 2019 | 978-4-592-16321-3 | April 12, 2022 | 978-1-63858-198-7 |
| 2 | November 12, 2019 | 978-4-592-16322-0 | June 28, 2022 | 978-1-63858-315-8 |
| 3 | August 11, 2020 | 978-4-592-16323-7 | October 18, 2022 | 978-1-63858-696-8 |
| 4 | June 29, 2021 | 978-4-592-16324-4 | February 28, 2023 | 978-1-63858-919-8 |
| 5 | July 29, 2021 | 978-4-592-16325-1 | August 1, 2023 | 978-1-68579-501-6 |
| 6 | June 29, 2022 | 978-4-592-16326-8 | October 22, 2024 | 979-8-88843-093-4 |
| 7 | February 28, 2023 | 978-4-592-16327-5 | January 14, 2025 | 979-8-88843-632-5 |
| 8 | December 27, 2023 | 978-4-592-16328-2 | May 27, 2025 | 979-8-89160-970-9 |
| 9 | October 29, 2024 | 978-4-592-16329-9 | November 18, 2025 | 979-8-89561-188-3 |

=== Anime ===
An anime television series adaptation was announced on August 11, 2020. The series is animated by MAPPA and directed by Seimei Kidokoro, with Hiroshi Seko handling series' composition, and Nao Ōtsu designing the characters. It aired from July 23 to October 1, 2021, on Fuji TV's Noitamina block. Tatsuya Kitani performed the opening theme song "Seija no Kōshin" (聖者の行進; 'March of the Saints'), while Akari Nanawo performed the ending theme song "Raika" (雷火; 'Flash of Lightning').

Crunchyroll streamed the series outside of Asia. Medialink has licensed the series in Southeast Asia and South Asia, streaming it on their Ani-One YouTube channel, exclusively available through its Ani-One Ultra Membership scheme.

==== Episodes ====
| No. | Title (Note: All English titles are taken from Crunchyroll.) | Directed by | Written by | Storyboarded by | Original release date (Note: Fuji TV listed the series air dates on Thursday at 24:55, which is effectively Friday at 0:55 a.m. JST.) |
|---|---|---|---|---|---|
| 1 | "Peacetime"; Transliteration: "Heion" (Japanese: 平穏) | Seimei Kidokoro | Hiroshi Seko | Seimei Kidokoro | July 23, 2021 |
800 years ago, demons brought humanity to the brink of extinction due to their immunity to conventional weapons; this crisis prompted the emergence of the Idaten, powerful battle deities who swiftly defeated and sealed the demons away, sacrificing themselves to maintain the seal and leaving only Rin to guard it and guide future gods. In the present day, the young Idaten Hayato, Ysley, and Paula investigate a human military operation on a northern glacier and discover a humanoid figure, Obami, reviving a frozen demon named Gyudo-kun; the demon breaks free and attacks, proving formidable enough to severely injure Ysley and Paula before Hayato ultimately destroys it, revealing that demons possess a mortal biology. Obami escapes in a high-speed jet but is revealed to be a self-destructing android after Hayato intercepts him, while elsewhere, soldiers from the Zoble Empire commit atrocities in a besieged town, violating a sister in a church despite her warnings of divine retribution.
| 2 | "The Black South"; Transliteration: "Kuro Minami" (Japanese: 黒南) | Papiko Aizō | Hiroshi Seko | Seimei Kidokoro | July 30, 2021 |
Recognizing the threat posed by Obami's mysterious controller and the potential for even stronger demons, Ysley and Paula resolve to begin training, seeking out Rin for instruction despite Ysley's traumatic memories of her brutal methods, having previously fled after only three months; upon finding her, a terrified Ysley immediately apologizes and begs to train again, moving Rin to tears with his apparent sense of duty, while Paula also commits, a decision she instantly regrets when Rin nearly kills her with a single punch, demonstrating the extreme and violent methodology she believes is necessary to stimulate an Idaten's evolution through decades of intense trauma, all while elsewhere the Zoble Empire's demonic-affiliated leadership, including the resurrected Obami and the powerful Piscalat, continues its militaristic agenda and consolidates its power.
| 3 | "Whirlwind"; Transliteration: "Hyō" (Japanese: 飄) | Ayataka Tanemura | Hiroshi Seko | Kazuhisa Takenouchi | August 6, 2021 |
800 years ago, a young Rin is saved from demons by her grandfather, who assures her that one day she will be the protector of new Idaten. In the present, Obami reviews footage of the Idatens defeating Gyudo-kun with the transformed demons; while most are confident they could defeat individual Idaten like Hayato, only Nickel and Brandy believe they could overcome multiple powerful foes, including Rin. Obami reveals he tracked the Idatens with a transmitter and plans to deploy their strongest asset, Nickel, to strike first. Meanwhile, Ysley, having discovered and altered the transmitter to lead the enemy to Rin, prepares with Paula and Hayato for a brutal training session under her. Nickel arrives and immediately proves a formidable threat, gravely injuring Hayato before Rin intervenes; after a brief exchange where Nickel boasts of being granted intelligence and human form by a demon lord, Rin effortlessly decapitates her, explaining that no single demon can defeat a trained Idaten. Reflecting on her 600-year journey to overcome fear and achieve strength, Rin remains resolute as the demons, realizing the immense power gap, recoil in panic. Ysley, coordinating the analysis of demon biology and advancing his own theories, contacts Prontea to continue their research, while a determined but chastened Hayato is forced to rest and regenerate.
| 4 | "Yellow Sparrow"; Transliteration: "Kōjaku" (Japanese: 黄雀) | Katsushi Sakurabi | Hiroshi Seko | Papiko Aizō | August 13, 2021 |
At the demon conclave, Piscalat confirms the existence of a fourth, immensely powerful Idaten from 800 years ago, Rin, who eliminated both Nickel and G-Thirteen; realizing their transmitters were compromised and their strategy exposed, a panicked Obami orders Piscalat, Neput, and Cory to utilize the Zoble military to hunt the other three Idatens while Rin, resolved to annihilate the entire Zoble Empire to eradicate the demon threat, is persuaded by Ysley to delay her assault for one week while they locate Prontea. Ysley, Paula, and Hayato travel to the free-market nation of Hotaena, where they find Prontea, whose mastery of esoteric Idaten abilities has advanced significantly; though initially terrified at the prospect of facing an angry Rin, Prontea agrees to assist after Ysley reveals his true plan: a psychohack into Zoble's network to ascertain demon numbers and capabilities. Meanwhile, the demons track the Idatens to Hotaena, and while Prontea's magical training session with Hayato reveals a fundamental weakness in the latter's power, their confrontation is interrupted by Neput and Cory, prompting a new battle just as Ysley, having learned from his researcher Gachikama that demons may be vulnerable to bioweapons and are attempting to propagate, is ambushed in his lab by Piscalat.
| 5 | "Color"; Transliteration: "Iro" (Japanese: 色) | Akiko Seki | Hiroshi Seko | Seimei Kidokoro | August 20, 2021 |
In Hotaena, the confrontation with the demons escalates as Cory transforms his head into a giant maw in an attempt to consume Hayato and Paula, though Paula exploits his blindness in this form to deliver a crippling kick, forcing him to disgorge Hayato. Simultaneously, Prontea effortlessly withstands Neput's assault and counters with a blinding lightning attack. Meanwhile, Ysley engages Piscalat in his laboratory, using tactical flash grenades and psychological manipulation to exploit her heightened sense of pride and shame, ultimately subduing her with a potent neurochemical cocktail delivered through the very tunnels her own hair created. After Hayato physically exhausts Cory into submission, both demons are captured and brought to Ysley's lab, where they and a now-brainwashed Piscalat reveal critical intelligence: there are 359 demons, but only three true threats remain—Brandy, Takeshita, and the incubator-like Umeyo—and that Miku's extraordinary perceptual abilities would instantly detect any neural tampering, making infiltration impossible. As Ysley puzzles over Obami's true nature, Miku, observing Rin's protective stance over the demon seal from afar, deduces her motivations while Obami joins them, speculating on the seal's significance. Piscalat confirms that Obami once ruled Zoble as Emperor Obama before faking his death and returning as a scientist, leaving his species and motives ambiguous until Ysley, after a private query, abruptly announces he has finally deduced Obami's true identity.
| 6 | "Smoke"; Transliteration: "Kemuri" (Japanese: 煙) | Teruyuki Ōmine | Hiroshi Seko | Ikuo Morimoto | August 27, 2021 |
Ysley deduces that the original demons sealed 800 years ago have perished, rendering Rin's vigil and the Idaten's sacrifice tragically unnecessary, a revelation arising from Prontea's replica seal containing only dead cockroaches. He further theorizes that Obami is a unique entity—an Idaten born from the coalescing thoughts of dying demons and the sacrificed gods over centuries, now trapped within the seal and projecting his consciousness through machines. This explains his fragmented knowledge and remote influence. While Prontea hesitates over whether to eliminate this fused being, Hayato undergoes rapid evolution in his training, mastering the ability to manipulate his body's density to deliver devastating blows against the brainwashed demons Piscalat and Neput, revealing his immense latent potential. Meanwhile, Miku's suspicions about Obami grow, and Brandy, anticipating an imminent attack, secretly dispatches three of her children with a demon to ensure the species' survival. As Ysley and Paula travel to Sarabael to manipulate the theocratic nation's fervor, they dramatically interrupt a sermon by crashing through a church wall and declaring themselves gods.
| 7 | "Performance"; Transliteration: "Gō" (Japanese: 業) | Yasuhiro Geshi | Hiroshi Seko | Papiko Aizō | September 3, 2021 |
Ysley and Paula secure an alliance with the theocratic state of Sarabael by theatrically presenting themselves as gods, leveraging the nation's foundational myths about Prontea, who centuries earlier terraformed their harsh landscape. Meanwhile, Miku deduces the semi-physical, conceptual nature of Idaten bodies and, foreseeing inevitable defeat, flees Zoble with Umeyo and Merku to ensure the demons' future propagation. As the Idaten coalition—now including a vastly improved Hayato who has mastered density manipulation—launches its invasion of Zoble, they systematically isolate the country. Rin initiates a indiscriminate assault, halted only by Hayato's intervention and redirected toward clear demon targets, while Prontea distinguishes and eliminates demons with precision. Brandy, remaining to defend Zoble, engages Rin remotely by puppeteering soldiers with her ultra-fine hair, creating a macabre battlefield of regenerating corpses. In a stark parallel, Hayato liberates human slaves from a prison building, where he is confronted by Takeshita, who mockingly identifies him as a god—though not the omnipotent creator the slaves worship—highlighting the complex and often cruel intersection of power, belief, and survival.
| 8 | "Idaten"; Transliteration: "Idaten" (Japanese: 韋駄天) | Akiko Seki | Hiroshi Seko | Shinji Satō | September 10, 2021 |
The final assault on the Zoble Empire culminates in a series of decisive confrontations: Hayato overcomes Takeshita through sheer resilience, though the dying demon reveals a withheld nuclear option and offers a grim warning to the human Gill about the inherent nature of demons. This interaction, born from Gill's desperate wish for protective power, spontaneously generates a new Idaten—Gill—formed from the collective desire for salvation within Zoble. Meanwhile, Rin is emotionally compromised when Obami, exhibiting memories unique to her grandfather, causes her to lower her guard; Brandy seizes this opportunity to critically injure Rin with her own sword, only for Rin to instantly recover and kill her in turn, leaving Rin weeping over the unresolved ghost of her past. As the battle concludes, Prontea neutralizes remaining threats and secures the confused new deity Gill, while the brainwashed Barcode collaborates with Piscalat and Cory to systematically locate and eliminate the last demon holdouts, bringing the war to an end six hours later.
| 9 | "Shadows"; Transliteration: "Kage" (Japanese: 陰) | Yasuhiro Geshi | Hiroshi Seko | Ikuo Morimoto | September 17, 2021 |
In the aftermath of Zoble's fall, a subdued Rin remains emotionally catatonic despite full physical regeneration, her spirit broken by the revelation surrounding Obami. Ysley coordinates the massive reconstruction effort, aided by the brainwashed demons Piscalat and Barcode, who confirm thirteen demons and two unborn children remain at large, including the highly intelligent Miku and the powerful Umeyo. The fledgling Idaten Gill, influenced by both Hayato's drive and the human Gill's compassion, desires to gain strength through training, while Prontea struggles to decipher the Demon Lord's encrypted research. A years-long hunt for the fugitive demons ensues, with Prontea and Ysley narrowly missing Kroft and Raki, who use subterfuge and theft to survive, and Miku's group establishing a horrifying foothold by murdering and impersonating a reclusive woman. The surviving demons fracture without leadership; Kuraishi futilely attempts to contact Obami while Buzz and Meliano, stranded on a remote island, confront their monstrous offspring and the bleak reality of their existence without the Demon Lord's guiding intelligence, ultimately regressing toward their bestial nature.
| 10 | "Demons"; Transliteration: "Ma" (Japanese: 魔) | Papiko Aizō | Hiroshi Seko | Papiko Aizō | September 24, 2021 |
After two years with no leads, Ysley learns from Piscalat that unfused demons are amorphous, tentacled beings with multiple eyes, a fact she demonstrates by revealing an eye inside her mouth. The fugitive demons' situation grows increasingly fractured: Buzz and Meliano emerge from isolation only to be executed by Cory for their uselessness, while Miku masterfully orchestrates contact with Obami through coded messages hidden in online purchases and childhood passwords, enabling a rendezvous with Kuraishi. Miku advises their cells remain separate to avoid total annihilation, and over the following seven years, the demons continue to propagate, with Raki bearing offspring and pure-blooded demons thriving in the ocean's abundance. Rin, long catatonic, is jolted back to awareness by sighting a demon consuming a whale, prompting her to reengage with the world. Meanwhile, Gill's training under Hayato and Cory shows remarkable progress, and Ysley intensifies the hunt by publicizing wanted posters. Miku, however, remains brazenly visible; she is recognized in public and murders a would-be captor, signaling a deliberate and provocative challenge to the Idaten.
| 11 | "Smells Fishy"; Transliteration: "Namagusa" (Japanese: 腥) | Seimei Kidokoro | Hiroshi Seko | Seimei Kidokoro | October 1, 2021 |
Prontea's pursuit of Miku ends in confusion as she vanishes from a building, a tactical feint that Ysley realizes too late was a diversion orchestrated by Obami. Using a drug to undo Piscalat's brainwashing, Obami—disguised in a mechanical soldier body—seizes the opportunity to ambush Ysley, severing his limbs while revealing that the "Miku" they chased was a decoy. Simultaneously, Cory and Paula are lured to Zoble and captured, with Cory drugged into submission. As Rin, stirred from her apathy by the ocean demon and the conflict around her, struggles to grasp the new allegiances, Prontea races to Zoble after Gill alerts him to Ysley's silence, only to witness Ysley's office explode. With Neput and Barcode also compromised, the demons successfully capture Ysley, Paula, and Cory, subjecting them to experimentation. Miku, now openly collaborating with the reprogrammed Piscalat, Kuraishi, and Ferlandia, deduces Obami's origins as an Idaten born from the seal, while a furious Rin begins a frantic search for her captured comrades.

== See also ==
- 33-sai Dokushin Onna Kishi Taichō, another manga series written by Amahara
- Dungeon Master: Creating a Hot Spring Dungeon, a light novel series written by Amahara
- Interspecies Reviewers, another manga series written by Amahara
