= Interspecies Reviewers =

Japanese fantasy sex comedy manga and its franchise

- First tankōbon volume cover

異種族レビュアーズ (Ishuzoku Rebyuāzu)
- Genre: Fantasy, sex comedy
- Manga
- Written by: Amahara
- Illustrated by: masha
- Published by: Fujimi Shobo
- English publisher: NA: Yen Press
- Imprint: Dragon Comics Age
- Magazine: Dragon Dragon Age
- Original run: August 19, 2016 – present
- Volumes: 12
- Light novel
- Written by: Tetsu Habara
- Illustrated by: W18
- Published by: Kadokawa
- English publisher: NA: Yen Press
- Original run: December 7, 2018 – January 9, 2020
- Volumes: 2
- Manga

Interspecies Reviewers Comic Anthology: Darkness
- Illustrated by: Various artists
- Published by: Kadokawa
- English publisher: NA: Yen Press
- Original run: January 9, 2020 – February 9, 2021
- Volumes: 2
- Anime television series
- Directed by: Yuki Ogawa
- Written by: Kazuyuki Fudeyasu
- Music by: Kotone Uchihigashi
- Studio: Passione
- Licensed by: Funimation (former); NA: Critical Mass Video (current)
- Original network: AT-X (uncensored); Tokyo MX, (Note: First four episodes only; broadcast discontinued on February 6, 2020 due to "changes in circumstances".) BS11, KBS, SUN, (Note: First six episodes only; broadcast discontinued on February 18, 2020 at the behest of the channel company's management.) GBS, (Note: From February 28, 2020.) BBC (Note: From March 7, 2020.) (censored)
- Original run: January 11, 2020 – March 28, 2020
- Episodes: 12
- icon

Interspecies Reviewers (Japanese: 異種族レビュアーズ, Hepburn: Ishuzoku Rebyuāzu) is a Japanese fantasy sex comedy manga series written by Amahara and illustrated by masha. It has been serialized through Nico Nico Seiga's manga website Dragon Dragon Age (Note: Dora Dora Doragon Eiji (ドラドラドラゴンエイジ); In December 2018, Kadokawa rebranded the service as Dora Dora Sharp# (ドラドラしゃーぷ#, Dora Dora Shāpu).) since August 2016 (Note: The first chapter was originally published on July 7, 2016 as a special one-shot in Fujimi Shobo's shōnen manga magazine Monthly Dragon Age.) and has been collected in twelve tankōbon volumes by Fujimi Shobo. The series is licensed in English by Yen Press. A 12-episode television anime adaptation produced by Passione aired from January to March 2020.

== Synopsis ==
In a world where many different humanoid species exist and prostitution is legal, there exist various brothels for each kind of species with "succu-girls" (サキュ嬢, Sakyu-jō), who have succubus blood running through them. As each species has different opinions on how each succu-girl works for them, various brothel visitors have become reviewers, rating their experiences with various succu-girls and posting them in the local tavern. The series largely centers on a human named Stunk, an elf named Zel, and an angel named Crimvael; Stunk and Zel's goal is to have experiences with every kind of succu-girl there is, to the point where they even wish to take their quest all the way to Heaven, while Crimvael (nicknamed "Crim") is searching for the missing piece of their halo, for they are unable to return to Heaven without it.

== Characters ==
Stunk (スタンク, Sutanku)
Voiced by: Junji Majima
A male human adventurer and one of the reviewers. He values appearance when it comes to succu-girls, though it is hinted he might harbor feelings for Meidri.
Zel (ゼル, Zeru)
Voiced by: Yūsuke Kobayashi
A male elf adventurer and one of the reviewers. He values succu-girls who have a high mana level.
Crimvael (クリムヴェール, Kurimuvēru)
Voiced by: Miyu Tomita
An angel with a broken halo who is rescued by Stunk and Zel and begins working at the Ale & Eats until they can repair their halo and return to Heaven. Although Crimvael possesses both male and female genitalia, they hide this fact from most others, allowing most people to believe they are male in order to avoid unwanted attention from Stunk and Zel. Crimvael is not very assertive and is somewhat embarrassed by the fact that they are by far the "largest" among the Reviewers.
Meidri (メイドリー, Meidorī)
Voiced by: M.A.O (Japanese); Brittany Lauda (English)
A young birdmaid waitress at the Ale & Eats, who is often dismayed at the antics of the reviewers and will get into a violent rage if they get her involved with their perverted behavior. She is the target of most of Stunk's sexual advances, which she always avoids by beating him up.
Mitsue (ミツエ)
Voiced by: Kyō Yaoya
An elderly human female prostitute. Despite her physical appearance, she is a favorite of Zel due to her high quality of mana.
Kanchal (カンチャル, Kancharu)
Voiced by: Kaede Yuasa
A male halfling reviewer. He has a fetish for BDSM in playing the role of the master.
Bruise (ブルーズ, Burūzu)
Voiced by: Kenji Hamada
A dogman reviewer with a preference for plump succu-girls. He grades the quality of succu-girls based on his sensitive senses.
Narugami (ナルガミ, Narugami)
Voiced by: Kengo Kawanishi
A lamia reviewer.
Samturn (サムターン, Samutān)
Voiced by: Yuuki Inoue
A demon reviewer.
Lulu (ルルゥ, Rurū)
Voiced by: Ayaka Nanase
An honorary fairy reviewer.
Count Delivel (デリベル, Deriberu)
Voiced by: Yōji Ueda
An honorary vampire reviewer. His name is translated as Count Call Girlula in Yen Press releases.
Demia Duodectet (デミア・デュオデクテット, Demia Duodekutetto)
Voiced by: Hibiku Yamamura
An archmage who runs a Magical Metropolis brothel offering copies of herself. She also endorses several establishments, including a gender-swap inn. She has a particular interest in Crimvael's unique properties. It is eventually revealed that she has the missing piece of Crim's halo, but what she plans to do with it is unknown.
Elma (エルマ, Eruma)
Voiced by: Momoyo Koyama
A female elf prostitute. She is often looked down upon by non-human species for being over 500 years old.
Mii (みー, Mī)
Voiced by: Karin Isobe
A catgirl prostitute who essentially starts Crimvael on their "journey" by being the first succu-girl they ever lay with.
Okpa (オクパ, Okupa)
Voiced by: Mari Hino
A prostitute with tentacles (a Cecaelia; though the series refers to her as a Dagon).
Eldry (エルドリー, Erudorī)
Voiced by: Rei Matsuzaki
A birdmaid prostitute.
Aloe (アロエ, Aroe)
Voiced by: Yōko Hikasa
A fairy madam and the proprietor of the Fairy Nectar brothel. She fornicates with clients as a hobby.
Milky (ミルキー, Mirukī)
Voiced by: Yuri Katō
A female minotaur prostitute with blue eyes and tan skin.
Ginny (ギニー, Ginī)
Voiced by: Yuka Nukui
A female minotaur prostitute with green eyes and fair skin.
Elza (エルザ, Eruza)
Voiced by: Makoto Koichi
A spotted hyena girl prostitute who seems to be one of Crimvael's favorites.
Piltia (ピルティア, Pirutia)
Voiced by: Shiori Izawa
A female halfling prostitute.
Roana (ローナ, Rōna)
Voiced by: Takako Tanaka
A female elf prostitute.
Tiaplate (ティアプレート, Tiapurēto)
Voiced by: Natsumi Takamori
A female fire spirit (salamander) prostitute.
Incubus (インキュバス, Inkyubasu)
Voiced by: Ryōta Ōsaka
An incubus reviewer who likes every type of woman to the point where he gives them all perfect tens, which inadvertently makes his reviews useless. He seems to take a liking to Meidri, much to her disgust.
Spirette (スピレット, Supiretto)
Voiced by: Juri Nagatsuma
A female spirit (ghost) prostitute.

== Media ==
=== Manga ===
Interspecies Reviewers is a manga series written by Amahara and illustrated by masha. The first chapter was launched on July 7, 2016, as a special one-shot in Fujimi Shobo's shōnen magazine Monthly Dragon Age; the manga began monthly serialization through Nico Nico Seiga's affiliated comic website Dragon Dragon Age on August 19. Amahara had previously drawn a similar 18+ comic series entitled Ishufūzoku Kurosu Rebyū (異種風俗クロスレビュー; lit. "Interspecies Sex Service Cross-Review") on Pixiv beginning in September 2014. As of October 2026, the manga has been collected in twelve tankōbon volumes published by Kadokawa. A manga anthology, illustrated by various artists, titled Interspecies Reviewers Comic Anthology: Darkness (異種族レビュアーズコミックアンソロジー 〜ダークネス〜) was released on January 9, 2020, with the second volume released on February 9, 2021. The main manga and the anthology are licensed in North America by Yen Press, which announced an English paperback release at Sakura-Con on March 31, 2018.

==== Volumes ====
===== Interspecies Reviewers =====
No.	Original release date	Original ISBN	English release date	English ISBN
1	September 8, 2017	978-4-04-072434-8	November 13, 2018	978-1-9753-0200-9
Chapters 1–11; Bonus (おまけ, Omake)
2	December 7, 2018	978-4-04-072970-1; 978-4-04-072974-9 (SE)	July 23, 2019	978-1-9753-5821-1
Chapters 12–21; Popularity Poll (人気投票, Ninki Tōhyō); Bonus (おまけ, Omake)
3	July 9, 2019	978-4-04-073257-2	February 18, 2020	978-1-9753-0814-8
Chapters 22–28; Bonus (おまけ, Omake)
4	January 9, 2020	978-4-04-073460-6	August 25, 2020	978-1-9753-1528-3
Chapters 29–35; Bonus (おまけ, Omake)
5	September 9, 2020	978-4-04-073793-5	July 13, 2021	978-1-9753-2427-8
Chapters 36–42; Bonus (おまけ, Omake)
6	May 8, 2021	978-4-04-074099-7	February 1, 2022	978-1-9753-3981-4
Chapters 43–49; Bonus (おまけ, Omake)
7	December 9, 2021	978-4-04-074382-0	December 13, 2022	978-1-9753-6004-7
Chapters 50–56; Bonus (おまけ, Omake)
8	November 8, 2022	978-4-04-074755-2	August 22, 2023	978-1-9753-7231-6
Chapters 57–63; Bonus (おまけ, Omake)
9	August 9, 2023	978-4-04-075074-3	October 15, 2024	979-8-8554-0167-7
Chapters 64–70; Bonus (おまけ, Omake)
10	June 7, 2024	978-4-04-075470-3	June 24, 2025	979-8-8554-1544-5
Chapters 71–78; Bonus (おまけ, Omake)
11	March 7, 2025	978-4-04-075832-9	April 28, 2026	979-8-8554-2769-1
Chapters 79–86; Bonus (おまけ, Omake)
12	October 9, 2026	978-4-04-076589-1	—	—
Chapters 87–94; Bonus (おまけ, Omake)

===== Interspecies Reviewers Comic Anthology: Darkness =====
No.	Original release date	Original ISBN	English release date	English ISBN
1	January 9, 2020	978-4-04-073461-3	January 19, 2021	978-1-9753-1959-5
2	February 9, 2021	978-4-04-073977-9; 978-4-04-073978-6 (SE)	March 22, 2022	978-1-9753-3874-9

=== Light novel ===
A light novel adaptation entitled Interspecies Reviewers: Ecstacy Days was published by Kadokawa on December 7, 2018. It was written by Tetsu Habara (葉原鉄) and illustrated by W18. A sequel, Interspecies Reviewers: Marionette Crisis, was published on January 9, 2020. The novels are licensed in North America by Yen Press; the first was released on August 18, 2020.

==== Volumes ====
No.	Title	Original release date	English release date
1	Interspecies Reviewers: Ecstacy Days; Ishuzoku Rebyuāzu Ekusutashi ̄Deizu (異種族レビュアーズ えくすたしー・でいず)	December 7, 2018; 978-4-04-073008-0	August 18, 2020; 978-1-9753-0947-3
2	Interspecies Reviewers: Marionette Crisis; Ishuzoku Rebyuāzu Marionetto Kuraishisu (異種族レビュアーズ まりおねっと・くらいしす)	January 9, 2020; 978-4-04-073453-8	May 18, 2021; 978-1-9753-2078-2

=== Anime ===
On June 28, 2019, Kadokawa announced that the manga would receive a television anime adaptation produced by Passione. The 12-episode series was directed by Yuki Ogawa and written by Kazuyuki Fudeyasu, with character designs by Makoto Uno and music composed by Kotone Uchihigashi. Junji Majima, Yūsuke Kobayashi, and Miyu Tomita (the voice actors of Stunk, Zel, and Crimvael, respectively) performed the opening theme song "Ikōze Paradise" (イこうぜ☆パラダイス; lit. "Let's Go Paradise") and the ending theme "Hanabira Ondo" (ハナビラ音頭; lit. "Flower Petal Ondō").

The series premiered on AT-X on January 11, 2020, with a censored version later airing on Tokyo MX, BS11, KBS, and SUN. In February 2020, Tokyo MX cancelled its broadcast due to "changes in circumstances within [the station]", while SUN cancelled future airings of the series at the behest of channel company's management. It began airing on GBS on February 28 and on BBC on March 7, 2020.

The anime was licensed in North America by Funimation, which simulcasted the first three censored episodes with English subtitles and later released a dubbed version of the first episode. However, the company removed the series from its online streaming platform on January 31, stating that it "fell outside of [Funimation's] standards". On February 1, the company's French subsidiary Wakanim announced that it would discontinue the English release, but continued offering the anime with French, German, and Russian subtitles. On February 2, Australian subsidiary AnimeLab announced that it would continue simulcasting the series in Australia and New Zealand after "adjusting [its] sourcing of materials". (Note: The series was removed in June 2021 when AnimeLab began the process of rebranding as Funimation.) On February 6, Amazon Prime Video removed the anime from its service.

Critical Mass Video planned to release the series with English subtitles completely uncensored on Blu-ray on December 7, 2021, but it was delayed until January 18, 2022.

==== Episodes ====
No.	Title (Note: English episode titles are taken from AnimeLab.)	Original release date
1	"A Hot 'n Heavy Debate About Elf and Human MILFs, an Angel Ascends at Meow Meow Paradise, Can't Get Enough of That Sensitive Birdmaid Cloaca!"; Transliteration: "Erufu no Jukujo to Ningen no Jukujo ni tsuite no Giron ga Futtō shi, Tenshi wa Nyan-nyan Tengoku de Shōten shi, Yū-yoku-jin wa Sō-haisetsu-kō de Kando mo Batsugun!" (Japanese: エルフの熟女と人間の熟女についての議論が沸騰し、天使はニャンニャン天国で昇天し、有翼人は総排泄孔で感度も抜群！)	January 11, 2020
In a world where prostitution is legal, there exist many brothels run by "succu-girls" of pretty much every species. Stunk the human and Zel the elf argue over who is better between a 500-year-old elf woman and a 50-year-old human, asking friends from other species to give reviews on them. The two soon rescue an angel named Crimvael, marking their new friendship by treating him to a catgirl succu-girl. As Crimvael takes up a job at the Ale & Eats tavern, Stunk and the others takes inspiration from the tavern's waitress, Meidri, and try out a birdwoman brothel, firmly establishing themselves as the Interspecies Reviewers.
2	"Fairies Have Limits on What They Can Take, Demons Aren't Very Popular, Minotaur Girls Are Big, Bountiful, and Boobylicious!"; Transliteration: "Fearī wa Ukeirerareru Saizu ni Seigen ga Ari, Akuma-zoku wa Amari Ninki ga Naku, Nyūgyū-kei no Minotaurosu wa Dekakute Yurete Sugoi Deru!" (Japanese: フェアリーは受け挿れられるサイズに制限があり、悪魔族はあまり人気がなく、乳牛系のミノタウロスはでかくて揺れてすごい出る！)	January 18, 2020
Stunk and the others check out a fairy brothel, only to discover that the fairies' small size means each person is limited as to who they can hire based on their own "size". During election campaigns, a representative of the Demon Party asks the Reviewers to visit a demon brothel in the hopes of improving the image of demons. However, they get distracted and end up reviewing a minotaur brothel instead.
3	"Gender-Swap Sex Means Less Succu-Girl Choices, and It Kinda Hurts, but You Learn Just What Girls Feel, So You Should Give It a Try!"; Transliteration: "Nyotai-ka Shite no Purei wa Eraberu Jō ga Sukunai shi, Kekkō Itai ga, Onna-no-ko no Kimochi ga Wakaru Yō ni Naru kara, Ichido gurai wa Keiken shite Oku no wa Ī kamo Shirenai zo!" (Japanese: 女体化してのプレイは選べる嬢が少ないし、結構痛いが、女の子の気持ちがわかるようになるから、一度ぐらいは経験しておくのはいいかもしれないぞ！)	January 25, 2020
Deciding to experience what it is like to be women, Stunk, Zel, Crimvael and Kanchal all visit the Gender Swap Inn, where they take a potion that transforms them into girls. As each reviewer tries out their new bodies with affiliated succu-girls with varying results, Crimvael raises eyebrows when he hires a hyena girl.
4	"Savage Succubi Will Squeeze the Life Out of You, Even If You Say You Can't Go On, Salamander Girls Have Such Hot Bods, Hearts, Sals, and Manders, That You Can't Help but Get Fired Up About 'Em!"; Transliteration: "Teikyū-inma wa, mō Denai to Itteiru no ni mo Kakawarazu, sara ni Shiboritorou to shite Kite Mohaya Gōmon no Iki. Saramandā-chan wa Mi mo Kokoro mo 'Sara' mo 'Man' mo 'Dā' mo, Totemo Hotto daga Hotto Sugite Hotton do Itchaisō ni Naru!" (Japanese: 低級淫魔は、もう出ないといっているのにもかかわらず、さらに搾り取ろうとしてきてもはや拷問の域。サラマンダーちゃんは身も心もサラもマンもダーも、とてもホットだがホットすぎてホットんど逝っちゃいそうになる！！)	February 1, 2020
The reviewers discover a back alley brothel that is priced extremely low due to the deadly nature of the ravenous pure-bred lilin. Ignoring all warnings, Stunk, Zel and the wolfman Bruise all jump into the fray, quickly coming to regret it. While running an errand in the volcanic region, the reviewers stop by a store where they can eat food off a fiery hot salamander woman, with only Crimvael being heat-resistant enough to enjoy the store's full benefits.
5	"I Wanna Drown in a Cyclops Girl's Pretty Eye, but It's Pretty Hard? Speaking of Hard, Let the Pros Pick Out the Perfect Mushroom Girl for a Slimy, Sticky Good Time!"; Transliteration: "Tangan-musume no Kagayaku Hitomi ni Oboretai kedo Hādoru Takasugi de, Onajiku Hādoru Takasugiru Kinoko-jō Erabi wa Kono Michi Sū-hyaku-nen no Puro ni Makasete Nuru-nuru Nettori Fuka-fuka!" (Japanese: 単眼娘の輝く瞳に溺れたいけどハードル高すぎで、同じくハードル高すぎるキノコ嬢選びはこの道数百年のプロに任せてヌルヌルねっとりふかふか！)	February 8, 2020
The reviewers receive an anonymous request to review a cyclops brothel, where they discover the main selling point is the size of their succu-girls' eyes. Later, the reviewers go to a myconid brothel, where the hostess gives them each unique mushroom girls to suit their needs, but struggles with choosing one for Crimvael.
6	"You Can Build the Perfect Golem Girl, but Don't Let the Girl You Base Her Off of Find Out. Cum to the Land of Dreams on the Light of the Will o' the Wisps!"; Transliteration: "Gōremu wa, Risō no Onna-no-ko sae Tsukurereba Sugoku Tanoshimeru kedo Sensu ga Towareru shi, Moderu ni Baretara Taihenna Koto ni Naru kamo Shirenai. Uiru-ō-uisupu no Mise wa Gensōteki na Hikari no Parēdo ga Iku, Masani Yume no Sono." (Japanese: ゴーレムは、理想の女の子さえ作れればすごく楽しめるけどセンスが問われるし、モデルにバレたら大変なことになるかもしれない。ウィルオーウィスプの店は幻想的な光のパレードがイク、まさに夢の園。)	February 15, 2020
Deciding to choose whatever species comes through the door, the reviewers wind up going to a golem brothel, where they have to build their desired partner from various parts. They all end up modelling their golems after Meidri, prompting swift punishment from the real Meidri when she finds out. Later, the reviewers go to a will-o'-the-wisp brothel, where the succu-girls are so bright that they all have to share the same room, leading to some very mixed reactions.
7	"The Gang Gets Laid at the Egg-stravagant Egg-Laying Show, Miss Meidri's Deep, Dark Secret Uncovered, and the Succu-Girl Popularity Ranking Is Unveiled!"; Transliteration: "Sanran-shō de Ossan-tachi no Me ga Ran-ran! Dashimasu Misemasu Meidorī-chan no Himitsu! Soshite Tsuini Happyō! Sakyubasu-jō Ninki-tōhyō!" (Japanese: 産卵ショーでおっさんたちの目がらんらん！出します見せますメイドリーちゃんのひみつ！そしてついに発表！サキュバス嬢人気投票！)	February 22, 2020
As Meidri deals with having to lay eggs, the reviewers go to an establishment where they can watch succu-girls lay eggs and bid on them, which only ends up appealing to a handful of species. Later, Mitsue the human succu-girl announces which succu-girl is the most popular among humans.
8	"Succu-girl Roleplay Will Get You Going All Night, the Angel's Holy Lance Is Great at Lancing Holes, the Succubus Tower Lasts Forever, but You (and Your Mayo) Won't!"; Transliteration: "Ime-sakyu no Erosu no Yume wa Yoru Hiraki, Tenshi no Ransu wa Seisō Naranu Seisō de, Sakyubasu-tawā wa Eien ni Gachi-mayo!" (Japanese: イメサキュのエロスの夢は夜開き、天使のランスは聖槍ならぬ性槍で、サキュバスタワーは永遠にガチマヨ！)	February 29, 2020
The reviewers visit an establishment centered around roleplay, where Crimvael has trouble handling the subject matter while Kanchal has gripes about the acting. To prepare for a long quest, the gang visit the Succubus Tower, where they can have real succubi take any form they request, but with the catch that they leave their customers completely drained for days on end.
9	"A Deep, Dark Something Lies Between the Living and the Dead, the Darling Angel's Lotion Explosion, and the Uncouth, Unsanctioned Reviewer Rivals Are in Their Scene!"; Transliteration: "Shitai to Shitai no Aida ni wa Fukakute Kurai Nani ga Ari, Wakaki Tenshi wa Rōshon Dai-bakuhatsu de, Yasei de Yasei no Rebyuā-tachi wa Ero no Raibaru!" (Japanese: 肢体と死体の間には深くて暗いナニがあり、若き天使はローション大爆発で、野生で野性のレビュアーたちはエロのライバル！)	March 7, 2020
While making a delivery to Count Delivel the vampire, Stunk, Zel and Bruise are introduced to an undead brothel, offering everything from zombies to vampires. Back at home, Crimvael visits a magical slime brothel by himself. Later, the gang discover some reviews written by a different group of reviewers, including one of a lesbian joint by a female film director named Bina Banana. Learning of an establishment that got a perfect score by all four reviewers, Stunk and the others begin traveling towards the Magic Metropolis to try it for themselves.
10	"Let Your Eyes Behold the Glory and Mystery of the Brothel with a Perfect Score! Take a Newlywed or a Horny Tutor or a Little Piggie as Your Lover! They'll Squeeze, Squeeze, Squeeze It Outta Ya! Infinite Pleasure over a Satisfying Three-Day Excursion! True Happiness Awaits!!!"; Transliteration: "Tsui ni akasareru ōru yonjutten manten no nazo! Nīzuma de inran katei-kyōshi de mesu-buta de koibito kibun! Demasu dashimasu hikitorimasu! Mugen kaihō! Dai-manzoku no mikka-kan! Oshiru mo tappuri! Minna oshiawase ni nacchaeeee!" (Japanese: ついに明かされるオール40点満点の謎！新妻で淫乱家庭教師で雌豚で恋人気分！出ます出します引き取ります！無限解放！大満足の3日間！お汁もたっぷり！みんなお幸せになっちゃええええっ！)	March 14, 2020
The reviewers arrive in the Magic Metropolis, where their money allows each of them to spend three days doing whatever they want with a decoy doll based on the Archmage Demia. As the reviewers find the benefits of their experience go beyond just the usual service, the real Demia takes a particular interest in Crimvael's unique properties. After the three days end and the decoys disappear, the reviewers give the Magic Metropolis a perfect score and have centaur porters deliver their reviews across the land. Back home, a mysterious man arrives at the Ale & Eats.
11	"The Frighteningly Faultless Philanthropist Sexually Satisfies Several Succubi, Drunken Fools and Their Money Are, of Course, Soon Parted, and Mitsue's Room Comes to a Close!"; Transliteration: "Katappashi kara inma o ikasemakuru osorubeki zetsurin wa hakuai-shugi-sha de, abuku-zeni ga haitta yopparai no matsuro wa osasshi no tōri de, Mitsue no heya wa honjitsu kanketsu!" (Japanese: 片っ端から淫魔をイかせまくる恐るべき絶倫は博愛主義者で、あぶく銭が入った酔っ払いの末路はお察しの通りで、ミツエの部屋は本日完結！)	March 21, 2020
An incubus takes offense to the reviewers' negative reviews, taking it upon himself to review these establishments himself and give them all perfect scores, although his bragging is cut short when a vengeful lover stabs him. After an arrangement with the Porter Guild and the rival reviewers pays huge dividends, the gang get drunk and go to a clurichaun establishment for succu-girls on top of more alcohol. Come morning, however, they find they have blown all of their money on the joint and other succu-girls with their reviews being too drunkenly written to make it back, forcing them to take on proper adventure requests to get their fortune back.
12	"Farewell, Beloved Fans of Our Beloved Reviewers... Worry Not; As Long as Succu-Girls Keep On Working Hard, So Too Will Our Reviewers. When You Think of Our Heroes, Remember This: When You Help Others (Get Their Fuck On), You're Only Helping Yourself (Get Your Fuck On)..."; Transliteration: "Rebyuāzu o aishite kudasatta minasan, sayōnara....... Sakyubasu-jō ga iru kagiri, rebyuāzu mo eien ni ikitsuzukeru deshō. Anata ga rebyuāzu o omou toki, itsumo koredake wa omoidasu deshō. Hito wa tanin o ikashita toki, hajimete jibun mo ikeru to yū koto'o......." (Japanese: レビュアーズを愛してくださったみなさん、さようなら……。サキュバス嬢が居る限り、レビュアーズも永遠に生き続けるでしょう。あなたがレビュアーズを想うとき、いつもこれだけは思い出すでしょう。ひとは他人をイカした時、初めて自分もイケるということを……。)	March 28, 2020
The reviewers finally visit the demon brothel they were originally supposed to review during the election. They are given special treatment due to the nature of how demons abide to contracts. Meanwhile, Demia meets up with the demon lord Death Abyss, discussing what things are like in a world without magic. As the New Year arrives and the reviewers find their favorite joints already booked, the fairy brothel owner introduces them to a dream eater brothel where they can revisit their choice of succu-girls inside their dreams.

== Reception ==
In August 2017, the manga was ranked 16th in the web category and was awarded the "DLsite Award" by Media Factory's manga news magazine Da Vinci and the streaming service Niconico.

The anime adaptation was controversial because it walked "the thin line of how explicit anime can be" as Isiah Jones of CBR noted. Stig Høgset of THEM Anime Reviews called the series "surprisingly entertaining" and sex positive while saying that it is "well thought out" with many of the sex workers having "distinct personalities" and said the show got away with a lot when it came to imagery. (Note: Høgset prefaced his review by saying that the series is centered around "a group of men going around having sex with various girls in brothel-like settings", and writing about their experiences at these establishments. He also noted that Crim has "sexual organs of both men and women".) added that the series bends the viewer's "expectations out of shape", felt uncomfortable with some parts of it, noted that the language used is direct, and praised it for being "animated pretty well". He concluded the review by saying that the series is one of the better "sex positive shows out there" and called it a "new record in openly sexual fun" but cannot be considered hentai, giving it a rating of 4 out of 5 stars.

=== Anime adaptation censorship in Australia ===
On March 9, 2020, the Australian Classification Board passed censored prints of the first four episodes series with an MA15+ rating; the censored version had censorship icons pasted over scenes of nudity and sexual activity. By that time, AnimeLab had eight episodes of the series available for streaming; all twelve were available by May.

In June 2021, AnimeLab's subscribers were relocated to Funimation, resulting in the immediate dropping of the series. A statement issued to subscribers of both platforms read:

We have determined that this series falls outside of our standards. We have the utmost respect for our creators so rather than substantially alter the content, we felt taking it down was the most respectful choice. As Australian and New Zealand users are now using the global Funimation platform, this applies to the AU/NZ region and this show will no longer be available to viewers in Australia and New Zealand.

In August 2021, Madman Entertainment submitted uncensored prints of all episodes of the series to the ACB; they were refused classification after the ACB found sex scenes involving halflings Kanchal and Piltia in the third and ninth episodes, and concluded that they "depict a person who appears to be under the age of 18 years in a manner likely to cause offence to a reasonable adult."

== See also ==
- 33-sai Dokushin Onna Kishi Taichō, another manga series written by Amahara
- Dungeon Master: Creating a Hot Spring Dungeon, a light novel series written by Amahara
- The Idaten Deities Know Only Peace, another manga series written by Amahara
