= Suicide Island =

Japanese manga series by Kouji Mori

- First tankōbon volume cover

自殺島 (Jisatsutō)
- Genre: Survival, suspense
- Manga
- Written by: Kouji Mori
- Published by: Hakusensha
- English publisher: NA: Dark Horse Comics
- Imprint: Jets Comics (2008–15); Young Animal Comics (2016)
- Magazine: Young Animal
- Original run: November 14, 2008 – August 26, 2016
- Volumes: 17
- Manga

Muhōtō
- Written by: Kouji Mori
- Published by: Hakusensha
- Imprint: Young Animal Comics
- Magazine: Young Animal
- Original run: February 8, 2019 – July 22, 2022
- Volumes: 6
- icon

Suicide Island (Japanese: 自殺島, Hepburn: Jisatsutō) is a Japanese manga series written and illustrated by Kouji Mori. It was serialized in Hakusensha's seinen manga magazine Young Animal from November 2008 to August 2016, with its chapters collected in seventeen tankōbon volumes. A prequel series, titled Muhōtō, was serialized in the same magazine from February 2019 to July 2022, with its chapters collected in six tankōbon volumes.

== Plot ==
Sei is a young man who is sent to a remote island after repeatedly attempting suicide, signing a document renouncing his will to live. Upon waking, he finds himself among other people who have also attempted suicide and were declared legally dead by the government. They learn that they have been exiled to the island, where there are no rules, except that escape is forbidden. The inhabitants are free to live as they choose, including ending their lives if they wish.

After witnessing the brutal consequences of suicide attempts on the island, Sei and several others decide that if they cannot die, they must learn how to live. The group begins to build shelter, gather food, hunt animals, and create a functioning community, while other groups on the island descend into violence.

== Publication ==
Written and illustrated by Kouji Mori, Suicide Island was serialized in Hakusensha's seinen manga magazine Young Animal from November 14, 2008, to August 26, 2016. Hakusensha collected its chapters in seventeen tankōbon volumes, released from August 28, 2009, to October 28, 2016.

A prequel, titled Muhōtō (無法島; lit. 'Lawless Island'), was serialized in Young Animal from February 8, 2019, to July 22, 2022. Hakusensha collected its chapters in six tankōbon volumes, released from September 27, 2019, to September 29, 2022.

In March 2026, Dark Horse Comics announced that it had licensed the manga for English release in North America.

=== Suicide Island ===
No.	Original release date	Original ISBN	English release date	English ISBN
1	August 28, 2009	978-4-592-14621-6	December 8, 2026	978-1-5067-5680-6
2	January 29, 2010	978-4-592-14622-3	—	—
3	June 29, 2010	978-4-592-14623-0	—	—
4	November 29, 2010	978-4-592-14624-7	—	—
5	April 28, 2011	978-4-592-14625-4	—	—
6	September 29, 2011	978-4-592-14626-1	—	—
7	March 29, 2012	978-4-592-14627-8	—	—
8	September 28, 2012	978-4-592-14628-5	—	—
9	May 29, 2013	978-4-592-14629-2	—	—
10	November 29, 2013	978-4-592-14630-8	—	—
11	May 29, 2014	978-4-592-14631-5	—	—
12	October 29, 2014	978-4-592-14632-2	—	—
13	May 29, 2015	978-4-592-14633-9	—	—
14	November 27, 2015	978-4-592-14634-6	—	—
15	June 29, 2016	978-4-592-14635-3	—	—
16	October 28, 2016	978-4-592-14636-0	—	—
17	October 28, 2016	978-4-592-14637-7	—	—

=== Muhōtō ===
No.	Japanese release date	Japanese ISBN
1	September 27, 2019	978-4-592-16501-9
2	March 27, 2020	978-4-592-16502-6
3	August 28, 2020	978-4-592-16503-3
4	April 28, 2021	978-4-592-16504-0
5	March 29, 2022	978-4-592-16505-7
6	September 29, 2022	978-4-592-16504-0

== Reception ==
By February 2019, Suicide Island had 3 million copies in circulation.
