= Gunslinger Girl =

Japanese manga series

- First tankōbon volume cover, featuring Henrietta
- Genre: Girls with guns; Political thriller
- Manga
- Written by: Yu Aida
- Published by: ASCII Media Works
- English publisher: NA: Seven Seas Entertainment
- Magazine: Dengeki Daioh
- Original run: May 21, 2002 – September 27, 2012
- Volumes: 15
- Anime television series
- Directed by: Morio Asaka
- Produced by: Takatoshi Hamano; Mori Ōi; Kazuya Watanabe; Satoshi Yoshimoto
- Written by: Junki Takegami
- Music by: Toshihiko Sahashi
- Studio: Madhouse
- Licensed by: Crunchyroll (Note: In North America through Crunchyroll (formerly known as Funimation), in the United Kingdom through Crunchyroll UK and Ireland (formerly known as Manga Entertainment) and in Australia through Crunchyroll Pty (formerly known as Madman Anime).)
- Original network: FNS (Fuji TV)
- English network: SEA: Animax Asia; US: IFC, Funimation Channel
- Original run: October 9, 2003 – February 19, 2004
- Episodes: 13
- Video game
- Developer: Dimps
- Publisher: Marvelous Entertainment
- Genre: Rail shooter
- Platform: PlayStation 2
- Released: April 8, 2004
- Anime television series

Gunslinger Girl -Il Teatrino-
- Directed by: Hiroshi Ishidori (Chief); Akira Mano
- Written by: Yu Aida; Tatsuhiko Urahata (assistance)
- Music by: Kow Otani
- Studio: Artland
- Licensed by: NA: Crunchyroll
- Original network: Tokyo MX, TV Osaka, Chūkyō TV
- English network: US: Funimation Channel
- Original run: January 8, 2008 – April 1, 2008
- Episodes: 13 + 2 OVAs
- icon

Gunslinger Girl (stylized in small caps) is a Japanese manga series written and illustrated by Yu Aida. It was serialized in Dengeki Daioh magazine from May 2002 to September 2012. Its chapters were collected in 15 tankōbon volumes by ASCII Media Works. Set in modern Italy, the series focuses on young cybernetic girls and their adult male handlers who use them as assassins under the directions of a government organization.

The manga series is licensed for an English language release in North America by Seven Seas Entertainment. A thirteen-episode anime adaptation produced by Madhouse aired in Japan on Fuji Television from October 2003, to February 2004. A sequel titled Gunslinger Girl -Il Teatrino- and created by Artland premiered in Japan on Tokyo MX TV in January 2008. It spanned thirteen episodes, concluding in April 2008. Two additional episodes were released on DVD in Japan in October 2008. Funimation has licensed both anime seasons and the OVAs.

As of December 2012, Gunslinger Girl had over 3.9 million copies in circulation. In 2012, the manga won the Excellence Award in the Manga Division at the 16th Japan Media Arts Festival.

== Plot ==
Set in Italy, Gunslinger Girl follows the exploits of the Social Welfare Agency (often referred to as simply "the Agency"), ostensibly a charitable institution sponsored by the Italian government. While the Agency professes to aid the rehabilitation of the physically injured, it is actually a military organization specializing in counter-intelligence and counter-terrorism. It is composed of two independent branches: Public Safety, its surveillance and intelligence-gathering division, and Special Ops, the anti-terrorist division.

Special Ops is itself divided into Sections 1 and 2, the latter of which employs young girls who have experienced traumatic and near-death experiences fitted with cybernetic implants as agents. The implants, which consist of synthesized muscles and carbon fiber frames, result in heightened strength and reflexes as well as high resilience to damage and pain.

Each girl is paired with an adult male trainer, or "handler", and together they are referred to as a fratello—Italian for "brother". The handler is responsible for the training, welfare and field performance of his charge, and is free to use whatever methods he considers suitable. While these methods vary according to the handler, a common part of each girl's regimen is brainwashing called "conditioning", which produces a deadly assassin with unquestioning loyalty to her handler but, if used excessively, also limits her life span.

Each fratello exhibits a unique dynamic. Most of the handlers have police or military backgrounds and were recruited directly into Section 2. Most also chose their own cyborgs from a list of candidates, though some appear to have been assigned a cyborg. The Social Welfare Agency primarily concerns itself with dealing with the Padania Republic Faction (PRF or RF), an organization seeking an independent Northern Italy through acts of terrorism and bribery.

== Media ==
=== Manga ===
Gunslinger Girl, written and illustrated by Yu Aida, premiered in Japan on May 21, 2002, in the monthly Dengeki Daioh magazine, and was completed with the September 27, 2012 issue. The chapters are also being published in collected volumes by ASCII Media Works, with the first volume released on November 27, 2002. The series was collected and published in fifteen volumes in Japan.

When ADV Manga was formed in 2003, the Gunslinger Girl manga series was one of the first titles the new branch of ADV Films licensed for an English language release in North America.

The first volume was released on November 18, 2003, with the next two volumes not released until 2005. At the 2005 AnimeNEXT convention, ADV representative David L. Williams said the slow schedule was due to ADV Manga feeling that they had rushed into the manga market in a period when it was too saturated with new manga titles. After the third volume was released that year, the series went on a two-year hiatus.

Release of the series resumed in July 2007 with the publication of the fourth volume, and six volumes were released as of April 2008. On April 8, 2010, manga publisher Seven Seas Entertainment announced that it had licensed Gunslinger Girl and would be re-released, with a new translation and in omnibus format.

=== Anime ===
Gunslinger Girl was adapted into a thirteen-episode anime series based on the first two volumes of the manga. It was directed by Morio Asaka and produced by Madhouse, Bandai Visual, Marvelous Entertainment and Fuji Television, with music by Toshihiko Sahashi. The song "The Light Before We Land" by Scottish indie rock band The Delgados was used as the opening theme. The series premiered in Japan on Fuji Television from October 8, 2003, to February 19, 2004. The series also aired in Japan on the satellite television network Animax, which later aired the series on its networks worldwide, including its English language networks in Southeast Asia and South Asia (where the series received its English language television premiere).

Gunslinger Girl was later aired in the United States on the Independent Film Channel in January 2007. In late 2004, Funimation Entertainment licensed the rights to release the first season of Gunslinger Girl across North America via a three-volume DVD series, releasing the last volume on September 6, 2005.

On September 19, 2006, Funimation released the complete Gunslinger Girl series in a three-DVD box set, with another version released on December 11, 2007. FUNimation's release of the first season is also available for download on iTunes, PlayStation Store, and Xbox Live Marketplace. A second season of the series, entitled Gunslinger Girl -Il Teatrino-, was officially announced in the October issue of Dengeki Daioh. It premiered on Tokyo MX TV on January 7, 2008, and ran for thirteen additional episodes until its conclusion on March 31, 2008. The second season was criticized for its lackluster animation, but earned praise for its more focused story line. This second season was animated by Artland and featured a new staff, with Gunslinger Girl creator Yu Aida being fully involved as the project's chief writer and supervisor. FUNimation has also licensed the second season and is currently streaming subtitled episodes on its website as well as on Veoh, promising a Region 1 retail release in 2009. Two additional episodes (14 and 15) were released on DVD in Japan on October 24, 2008. The sequel is licensed for English language release in Australia and New Zealand by Madman Entertainment and in North America by Funimation Entertainment.

The second season made its North American television debut on October 19, 2011, on the Funimation Channel. Gunslinger Girl and Gunslinger Girl: Il Teatrino, the latter including the two additional episodes, were added to the Netflix library in Canada, Singapore, the United States, and Australia as well as some other countries in January 2016.

=== Video games ===
A set of video games have also been produced for the PlayStation 2, released only in Japan. These take the form of rail shooters in which the player controls one of the girls on her missions. The series is composed of three volumes. There is an additional rogue fratello in these games, who go by the names Earnest (handler) and Pia (cyborg). Earnest and Pia do not appear in the manga or anime, nor are they ever mentioned. Pia's preferred weapons were the Desert Eagle .50AE and M16A1 with M203 grenade launcher.

On January 9, 2020, it was announced a collaboration between the mobile game Girls' Frontline and Gunslinger Girl, in which the characters of Angelica, Claes, Rico, Triela and Henrietta would become units available in the game. alongside a new story event merging the world of Gunslinger Girl -Il Teatrino- into the world of Girls' Frontline, a future in which humanity suffered a third world war and environmental collapse, leading to technologically advanced tactical doll or "T-Dolls" are used in combat.

=== Other ===
On December 21, 2005, an image album for Gunslinger Girl called Poca Felicità was released by Marvelous Entertainment. It contains various songs for each of the girls (sung by their respective voice actresses), as well as an instrumental for Pinocchio, extra songs by Josefa, and two other instrumentals. Revo of Sound Horizon wrote all the music and lyrics for the album. The cover art was drawn by Yu Aida.

== Reception ==
As of December 2012, the manga had over 3.9 million copies in circulation. In 2012, the Ministry of Cultural Affairs announced the winners of the 16th Japan Media Arts Festival Awards. The Gunslinger Girl manga series won an award for excellence in the Manga Division.

Jonathan Clements and Helen McCarthy feel the trauma suffered by the girls allows Gunslinger Girl to show them as "submissive blank slates in the style of Chobits", feeling that while some handlers treated them like objects, those that tried to befriend them used methods that were like "the seduction of 'damaged goods' in less popular works such as the Lolita Anime".
