= 1518! =

Japanese manga series

- Manga volume 1 cover

1518! イチゴーイチハチ! (Ichi Go Ichi Hachi!)
- Manga
- Written by: Yu Aida
- Published by: Shogakukan
- Magazine: Weekly Big Comic Spirits
- Original run: August 11, 2014 – March 11, 2019
- Volumes: 7

1518! (1518! イチゴーイチハチ!, Ichi Go Ichi Hachi!) is a Japanese manga series written and illustrated by Yu Aida. It was serialized in Shogakukan's seinen manga magazine Weekly Big Comic Spirits from August 2014 to March 2019.

== Media ==
=== Manga ===
Written and illustrated by Yu Aida, 1518! started in Weekly Big Comic Spirits on August 11, 2014. After various hiatuses that began in October 2015, the series continued in the magazine on a monthly basis starting in March 2017. The series finished on March 11, 2019. Shogakukan collected its chapters in seven tankōbon volumes, released from March 30, 2015, to April 12, 2019.

==== Volumes ====
| No. | Japanese release date | Japanese ISBN |
|---|---|---|
| 1 | March 30, 2015 | 978-4-09-186605-9 |
| 2 | November 30, 2015 | 978-4-09-187418-4 |
| 3 | November 30, 2016 | 978-4-09-187737-6 |
| 4 | August 30, 2017 | 978-4-09-189624-7 |
| 5 | March 30, 2018 | 978-4-09-189819-7 |
| 6 | September 28, 2018 | 978-4-09-860079-3 |
| 7 | April 12, 2019 | 978-4-09-860295-7 |

=== Stage play ===
A stage play adaptation, titled Seishun Butai 1518! Ichi Go Ichi Hachi! (青春舞台「1518! イチゴーイチハチ」), ran in Tokyo's Ikebukuro Theater Green from February 17–23, 2021.

== Reception ==
1518! ranked 19th in the fourth Next Manga Award in the print category in 2018.
