= Henjō: Hen na Joshikōsei Amaguri Senko =

Japanese manga series

- First tankōbon volume cover

変女〜変な女子高生 甘栗千子〜
- Genre: Romantic comedy
- Manga
- Written by: Yoshiru Konogi
- Published by: Hakusensha
- Imprint: Young Animal Comics
- Magazine: Young Animal Island (2012–13); Young Animal Innocent (2014); Young Animal (2015–present)
- Original run: September 28, 2012 – present
- Volumes: 22
- Manga

Sekirara Hime to Minus Ōji
- Written by: Yoshiru Konogi
- Published by: Hakusensha
- Magazine: Manga Park
- Original run: August 7, 2017 – April 29, 2019
- Manga

Eroko-san on the Attack
- Written by: Yoshiru Konogi
- Published by: Hakusensha
- English publisher: NA: Comikey
- Imprint: Young Animal Comics
- Magazine: Young Animal
- Original run: July 26, 2019 – September 26, 2025
- Volumes: 9
- icon

Henjō: Hen na Joshikōsei Amaguri Senko (変女〜変な女子高生 甘栗千子〜) is a Japanese manga series written and illustrated by Yoshiru Konogi. It started publishing in Hakusensha's seinen manga magazine Young Animal Island (later renamed Young Animal Innocent) from September 2012 to March 2014 and started a regular serialization in the publisher's Young Animal magazine in March 2015. The series' chapters have been compiled into 22 tankōbon volumes as of August 2026. A spin-off series, Eroko-san on the Attack, was serialized in Young Animal from July 2019 to September 2025, and another spin-off, Sekirara Hime to Minus Ōji, was published on the Manga Park website from August 2017 to April 2019.

== Plot ==
The series follows Senko Amaguri, a high school girl whose family runs a cleaning and repair service. She encounters Ryō Takamura and Kōhei Sugita, two friends looking for a job. She becomes interested in Ryō after following them to the restroom and noticing that his penis has phimosis. The two become employees at the company, where they have to deal ith Senko's strong interest in sex.

== Characters ==
=== Henjō ===
Senko Amaguri (甘栗 千子, Amaguri Senko)
Voiced by: Rika Kinugawa (drama CD)
A high school student whose father runs a cleaning and repair service. She has a strong interest in sex and is fond of making sexual jokes. She has an interest in penises and can sense when a man has an erection. She does well in school and in sports and goes to a technical high school. Although she initially acts cold towards Ryō, she later develops feelings for him. She lives with her father as her mother is working overseas.
Ryō Takamura (高村 亮, Takamura Ryō)
Voiced by: Jun Fukushima (drama CD)
An employee at Handyman Amaguri. He has a strong sexual drive and masturbates daily, although he is still a virgin. His family is aware of his job but is worried that he does not earn enough from it. As time goes on, he develops feelings for Senko, although he remains confused about it.
Kōhei Sugita (杉田 航平, Sugita Kōhei)
Voiced by: Takayuki Kondo (drama CD)
Ryō's best friend since childhood and his co-worker at Handyman Amaguri. Unlike Ryō, he has sexual experience. He has a large penis, which Ruka nicknamed "Big Mountain". He later starts dating Ruka.
Ruka Seto (瀬戸 流河, Seto Ruka)
Voiced by: Yuiko Tatsumi (drama CD)
Ryō's younger cousin and a university student. She has had feelings for him since childhood and treats him as an older brother. She later starts working part-time at Handyman Amaguri, gaining an interest in penises because of Senko's influence. She later falls in love with Kōhei and they became a couple.

=== Eroko-san on the Attack ===
Eruko Shindō (進藤 絵留子, Shindō Eruko)
A 27-year-old NEET who is a popular social media personality and influencer. She is nicknamed "Eroko" due to its similarity to her name. She meets Natsuki, whom she calls Hoshi-kun, and desires to lose her virginity to him.
Natsuki Hoshi (星 夏樹, Hoshi Natsuki)
Voiced by: Minoru Shiraishi (drama CD)
A high school student who goes to the same school as Senko. He confessed to her but was ultimately rejected. Formerly a delinquent, he dyed his hair black at Kōhei's suggestion. He later starts a relationship with Eruko.

=== Sekirara Hime to Minus Ōji ===
Riri Momoki (桃木 りり, Momoki Riri)
Voiced by: Saki Ono (drama CD)
A high school girl who becomes an apprentice under Senko. Due to Senko's influence, she too becomes interested in sex, leading to her being nicknamed Bokki-chan (勃起ちゃん; lit. 'Erection-chan').

== Publication ==
Written and illustrated by Yoshiru Konogi, Henjō: Hen na Joshikōsei Amaguri Senko was first published for four chapters in Hakusensha's seinen manga magazine Young Animal Island from September 28, 2012, to September 27, 2013; the magazine was renamed Young Animal Innocent on March 19, 2014, and another chapter of Henjō was published; the magazine was discontinued afterwards. Henjō started a regular serialization in the publisher's Young Animal on March 13, 2015. The individual chapters have been compiled into twenty-two tankōbon volumes as of August 2026. Drama CDs were bundled with the limited edition releases of volumes 6 and 7.

A spin-off series, titled Sekirara Hime to Minus Ōji (セキララ姫とマイナス王子), was serialized for three chapters on the Manga Park website between August 7, 2017, and April 29, 2019.

A second spin-off series, titled Eroko-san on the Attack (進撃のえろ子さん～変なお姉さんは男子高生と仲良くなりたい～, Shingeki no Eroko-san: Hen na Onee-san wa Danshikōsei to Nakayoku Naritai), was serialization in Young Animal from July 26, 2019, to September 26, 2025. The individual chapters were compiled into nine tankōbon volumes from January 29, 2020, to October 29, 2025. Comikey licensed the series in English.

=== Volumes ===
No.	Release date	ISBN
1	June 27, 2014	978-4-592-14193-8
2	August 28, 2015	978-4-592-14194-5
3	November 27, 2015	978-4-592-14195-2
4	April 28, 2016	978-4-592-14196-9
5	August 29, 2016	978-4-592-14197-6
6	January 27, 2017	978-4-592-14198-3; 978-4-592-10570-1 (SE)
7	July 28, 2017	978-4-592-14199-0; 978-4-592-10581-7 (SE)
8	November 29, 2017	978-4-592-14888-3
9	March 29, 2018	978-4-592-14889-0
10	July 27, 2018	978-4-592-14890-6
11	November 29, 2018	978-4-592-16291-9
12	March 29, 2019	978-4-592-16292-6
13	July 29, 2019	978-4-592-16293-3
14	January 29, 2020	978-4-592-16294-0
15	June 29, 2021	978-4-592-16295-7
16	November 29, 2021	978-4-592-16296-4
17	January 27, 2023	978-4-592-16297-1
18	September 29, 2023	978-4-592-16298-8
19	August 29, 2024	978-4-592-16299-5
20	May 29, 2025	978-4-592-16300-8
21	February 27, 2026	978-4-592-16320-6
22	August 28, 2026	978-4-592-16711-2

=== Eroko-san on the Attack ===
No.	Original release date	Original ISBN	English release date	English ISBN
1	January 29, 2020	978-4-592-16481-4	August 1, 2025	979-8-8922-0132-2
2	May 29, 2020	978-4-592-16482-1	November 1, 2025	979-8-8922-0207-7
3	October 29, 2020	978-4-592-16483-8	February 1, 2026	979-8-8922-0216-9
4	June 29, 2021	978-4-592-16484-5	—	—
5	August 29, 2022	978-4-592-16485-2	—	—
6	May 29, 2023	978-4-592-16486-9	—	—
7	February 29, 2024	978-4-592-16487-6	—	—
8	February 28, 2025	978-4-592-16488-3	—	—
9	October 29, 2025	978-4-592-16489-0	—	—

== Reception ==
It was reported in 2020 that Henjō had sold over a million copies.
