= Young Animal (magazine) =

Japanese manga magazine

- Cover of the magazine's July 14, 2006 issue featuring model Yuko Ogura
- Categories: Seinen manga
- Frequency: Biweekly
- Circulation: 30,917; (July–September 2026)
- Founded: May 1992
- Company: Hakusensha
- Country: Japan
- Based in: Tokyo
- Language: Japanese
- Website: magazine.younganimal.com

Young Animal (Japanese: ヤングアニマル, Hepburn: Yangu Animaru) is a biweekly Japanese seinen manga magazine that features photos of gravure idols. It has been published by Hakusensha on the second and fourth Friday of each month since 1992.

== History and profile ==
Young Animal was launched in May 1992. The magazine is a successor to Monthly Animal House (月刊アニマルハウス, Gekkan Animaru Hausu), Hakusensha's previous seinen manga magazine that ran from 1989 to 1992. Young Animal is issued on the second and fourth Friday of each month in saddle-stapled B5 format. Its headquarters is in Tokyo.

A typical issue consists of about 300 black-and-white pulp pages of manga wrapped in about 20 slick pages of color pinup photos of teenage girls in bikinis (generally pop stars and gravure idols). Advertising (other than house ads for Hakusensha) appears only in the form of a few ads in the back pages and on the inside and back covers. As of 2015, circulation is approximately 119,000 copies. Each issue features about 15 different stories, mostly serial stories tending toward sexy romantic comedy, fantasy, and epic adventure, with a number of humorous yonkoma or four-panel gag strips.

Popular long-running series appearing in Young Animal include the medieval dark fantasy adventure Berserk and the modern day married-life sex comedy Futari Ecchi (both over 300 chapters as of 2010). A number of Young Animal manga series have been adapted into anime.

Titles serialized in Young Animal are published as tankōbon volumes by Hakusensha under the Young Animal Comics imprint. Prior to June 2016, volumes were published under the Jets Comics imprint.

Young Animal has also inspired several spin-off magazines: Young Animal Arashi (2000–2018); Young Animal Island (2004–2013), briefly relaunched as Young Animal Innocent (2014); and Young Animal Zero (2019–present).

== Features ==
=== Series ===
There are currently 15 manga titles being serialized in Young Animal.

Series title	Author	Premiered
Berserk (ベルセルク, Beruseruku)	Kentaro Miura (Note: Following Miura's death in May 2021, Kouji Mori took on the role of "supervisor" of the manga and Miura's group of assistants and apprentices from Studio Gaga are in charge of the artwork.)	October 1992 (Note: Initially serialized in Monthly Animal House beginning in 1989. Started in the 11th issue of 1992.)
D.Diver (D.ダイバー, Dī Daibā)	Kouji Mori	May 2023
Futari Ecchi (ふたりエッチ, Futari Etchi)	Katsu Aki	December 1996
Henjō: Hen na Joshikōsei Amaguri Senko (変女～変な女子高生 甘栗千子～)	Yoshiru Konogi	March 2015 (Note: Transferred from Young Animal Island.)
I'm a Behemoth, an S-Ranked Monster, but Mistaken for a Cat, I Live as an Elf Girl's Pet (Sランクモンスターの《ベヒーモス》だけど、猫と間違われてエルフ娘の騎士として暮らしてます, Esu Ranku Monsutā no "Behimosu" Dakedo Neko to Machigawarete Erufu Musume no Petsuto to Shite Kurashitemasu)	Nozomi Ginyoku (original story), Taro Shinonome	July 2018 (Note: Transferred from Young Animal Arashi.)
Love Shooting Star: Cowwwwpa! (愛の流星カウーパ, Ai no Ryūsei Kaupa)	Uran	September 2024
Mahō Chūnen (魔法中年)	Maki (original story), Nemumi Haiba	March 2022
March Comes In like a Lion (3月のライオン, Sangatsu no Raion)	Chica Umino	July 2007
Now That We Draw (描くなるうえは, Kakunaru Ue wa)	Kyū Takahata (story), Kabatani (art)	February 2023
OL, Rakko O Kau (OL、ラッコを飼う)	Tomoyuki Inoue	August 2019
A Pen, Handcuffs, and a Common-Law Marriage (ペンと手錠と事実婚, Pen to Wappa to Jijitsukon)	Shinichi Sawaragi (story), Tank Gas-yama (art)	December 2022
Playful Relationships (あそびのかんけ, Asobi no Kankei)	Sekina Aoi (story), Kurehito Misaki (art)	September 2026
Rock Is a Lady's Modesty (ロックは淑女の嗜みでして, Rokku wa Redi no Tashinami deshite)	Hiroshi Fukuda	October 2022
The Shiunji Family Children (紫雲寺家の子供たち, Shiunji-ke no Kodomo-tachi)	Reiji Miyajima	February 2022
The Valiant Must Fall (勇気あるものより散れ, Yūki Aru Mono Yorichire)	Yu Aida	February 2021

=== Former series ===
==== 1990s ====
- Japan (ジャパン) by Buronson (story) and Kentaro Miura (art) (1992)
- Buttobi!! CPU (ぶっとび!!CPU, Buttobi!! Shī Pī Yū) by Kaoru Shintani (1993–1997)
- Air Master (エアマスター, Ea Masutā) by Yokusaru Shibata (1996–2006)
- Cestvs: The Roman Fighter (セスタス -The Roman Fighter-, Sesutasu -Za Rōman Faitā-) by Shizuya Wazarai (1997–2009)
- Ai Yori Aoshi (藍より青し) by Kou Fumizuki (1998–2005)
- Mouse by Satoru Akahori (story) and Hiroshi Itaba (art) (1999–2004)

==== 2000s ====
- Holyland (ホーリーランド, Hōrīrando) by Kouji Mori (2000–2008)
- Yubisaki Milk Tea (ゆびさき ミルク ティー, Yubisaki Miruku Tī) by Tomochika Miyano (2002–2010)
- Chocotto Sister (ちょこッとSister, Chokotto Shisutā) by Gō Zappa (story) and Sakura Takeuchi (art) (2003–2007)
- This Ugly yet Beautiful World (この醜くも美しい世界, Kono Minikuku mo Utsukushii Sekai) by Ashita Morimi (2003–2005)
- Yuria 100 Shiki (ユリア100式) by Shigemitsu Harada (story) and Nobuto Hagio (art) (2005–2010)
- Detroit Metal City (デトロイト・メタル・シティ, Detoroito Metaru Shiti) by Kiminori Wakasugi (2005–2010)
- KimiKiss: Various Heroines (キミキス -various heroines-) by Tarō Shinonome (2006–2009)
- Ateya no Tsubaki by Kanji Kawashita (2007–2020) (Note: Moved to Manga Park.)
- Nobunaga no Shinobi (信長の忍び) by Naoki Shigeno (2008–2025)
- Jisatsutō (自殺島) by Kouji Mori (2008–2016)
- Sickness Unto Death (死に至る病, Shi ni Itaru Yamai) by Hikaru Asada (story) and Takahiro Seguchi (art) (2009)
- Usotsuki Paradox (うそつきパラドクス, Usotsuki Paradokusu) by Nanki Satō (story) and Akira Kiduki (art) (2009–2012)
- Nana & Kaoru (ナナとカオル, Nana to Kaoru) by Ryuta Amazume (2009–2016) (Note: Initially serialized in Young Animal Arashi beginning in 2008.)
- Amagami: Precious Diary (アマガミ precious diary) by Tarō Shinonome (2009–2011)

==== 2010s ====
- Kendo Shitō Den Cestvs (拳奴死闘伝セスタス, Kendo Shitō Den Sesutasu) by Shizuya Wazarai (2010–2014) (Note: Continued in Young Animal Arashi (2014–18), Manga Park (2018–2020), and Young Animal Zero (2020–present))
- Tokyo Yamimushi (東京闇虫) by Yūki Honda (2010–2016)
- Photo Kano: Your Eyes Only (フォトカノ Your Eyes Only) by Nylon (2012–2013)
- Mai Ball! (マイぼーる!, Mai Bōru) by Sora Inoue (2012–2019)
- Giganto Maxia (ギガントマキア, Gigantomakia) by Kentaro Miura (2013–2014)
- How Clumsy you are, Miss Ueno (上野さんは不器用, Ueno-san wa Bukiyō) by Tugeneko (2015–2022)
- Boku to René to Aoarashi (僕とルネと青嵐, Boku to Rune to Aoarashi) by Kou Fumizuki (2015–2016)
- Peleliu: Guernica of Paradise (ペリリュー -楽園のゲルニカ-, Periryū -Rakuen no Gerunika-) by Kazuyoshi Takeda (2016–2021)
- Record of Grancrest War (グランクレスト戦記, Gurankuresuto Senki) by Ryo Mizuno (story) and Makoto Yotsuba (art) (2016–2019)
- Asobi Asobase (あそびあそばせ) by Rin Suzukawa (2016–2022) (Note: Initially serialized in Young Animal Densi beginning in 2015)
- Tenjiku Neppūroku (天竺熱風録) by Yoshiki Tanaka (story) and Sei Itō (art) (2016–2019)
- Boku wa Ikemen (ボクはイケメン) by Nanki Satō (story) and Akira Kiduki (art) (2016–2018)
- Gal Gohan (ギャルごはん, Gyaru Gohan) by Marii Taiyou (2016–2020)
- Dokunie Cooking (毒贄クッキング, Dokunie Kukkingu) by Suu Minazuki (2017–2019)
- Our Last Crusade or the Rise of a New World (キミと僕の最後の戦場、あるいは世界が始まる聖戦, Kimi to Boku no Saigo no Senjō, Aruiwa Sekai ga Hajimaru Seisen) by Kei Sazane (original story) and Okama (2018–2021)
- Witches Are In Their Prime In Their Three-Hundreds (魔女は三百路から, Majo wa Mioji Kara) by Shigemitsu Harada (story) and Kyūjo Matsumoto (art) (2018–2020)
- The Idaten Deities Know Only Peace (平穏世代の韋駄天達, Heion Sedai no Idaten-tachi) by Amahara (original story) and Coolkyousinnjya (art) (2018–2024)
- Muhōtō (無法島) by Kouji Mori (2019–2022)
- Eroko-san on the Attack (進撃のえろ子さん～変なお姉さんは男子高生と仲良くなりたい～, Shingeki no Eroko-san Hen'na Onee-san wa Danshikōsei to Nakayoku Naritai) by Yoshiru Konogi (2019–2025)

==== 2020s ====
- Ore wa Lolicon ja Nai! (俺はロリコンじゃない！, Ore wa Roricon ja Nai!) by Uran (2020–2023)
- I Get the Feeling That Nobukuni-san Likes Me (となりの信國さんは俺のことが好きな気がする, Tonari no Nobukuni-san wa Ore no Koto ga Suki na Ki ga Suru) by Kousuke Yasuda (2020–2024)
- Peleliu Gaiden (ペリリュー –外伝–, Periryū Gaiden) by Kazuyoshi Takeda (2021–2025)
- Jofū (じょふう) by Ryuta Amazume (2021–2025)
- Kono Fukushū ni Gal wa Iranai (この復讐にギャルはいらない, Kono Fukushū ni Gyaru wa Iranai) by Manose (2022–2024)
- Love Flops (恋愛フロップス, Ren'ai Furoppusu) by Love Flops Project (original story) and Ryūdai Ishizaka (2022–2023)
- Tokyo Satsujin Gakuen (東京殺人学園) by Higuma (story) and Ryūtarō Masuya (art) (2023–2025)
- Outreijyo (アウトレイジョウ, Autoreijō) by Keiso (story) and Kenta Yuzuriha (art) (2023–2025)
- Shinmei no Rescue (神命のレスキュー, Shinmei no Resukyū) by Kirie (2023–2025)
- Voices from Chernobyl (チェルノブイリの祈り, Cherunobuiri no Inori) by Svetlana Alexievich (original author), Tetsuji Imanaka (supervision) and Yuta Kumagai (art) (2023–2025)
- Sōsei no Taiga (創世のタイガ) by Kouji Mori (2023) (Note: Initially serialized in Kodansha's Evening in 2017; continued in Young Animal Zero (2023–present))
