= Yuru =

Yuru may refer to:

- Yuru people
  - Yuru language
- Yuru: The protagonist of Hiromu Arakawa's manga Daemons of the Shadow Realm.

== Places ==
- Abu Yuru, Iran
- Yuru Monastery
- Yuru Camp

== People ==
- Li Yuru (1923–2008), Chinese singer
- Lin Yuru (1926–2003), Chinese writer
- Ye Yuru (born 1955), Mandarin name of Nancy Ip
