= Daemons of the Shadow Realm (TV series) =

Japanese anime television series

- 黄泉のツガイ; Yomi no Tsugai
- Type: TV series
- Genre: Adventure; Dark fantasy; Supernatural
- Based on: Daemons of the Shadow Realm
- Created by: Hiromu Arakawa
- Directed by: Masahiro Andō
- Series composition: Noboru Takagi
- Character designer: Nobuhiro Arai
- Music by: Kenichiro Suehiro
- Voices of: Kensho Ono; Yume Miyamoto; Yuichi Nakamura; Miyuri Shimabukuro; Junichi Suwabe; Misaki Kuno; Takako Honda; Rikiya Koyama
- No. of seasons: 1
- No. of episodes: 24

Production
- Art director: Tatsurō Ōnishi
- Sound director: Kazuhiro Wakabayashi
- Cinematographer: Zhang Yingying
- Color designer: Yukari Goto
- CG director: Mizuki Sasaki
- Editor: Ayumu Takahashi
- Studio: Bones Film
- Producers: Yoshihiro Oyabu (chief); Kyōko Uryū (chief); Yasutaka Kimura (chief); Nobuhito Takemoto; Souta Furuhashi; Shōta Komatsu
- Production companies: Aniplex; Square Enix; Bones
- Runtime: 23 minutes

Original release
- Networks: Tokyo MX, GTV, GYT, BS11
- Release: April 4, 2026 – present

Daemons of the Shadow Realm (Japanese: 黄泉のツガイ, Hepburn: Yomi no Tsugai; lit. 'Pairs from the Underworld') is a Japanese anime television series produced by Bones Film, based on the manga series Daemons of the Shadow Realm by Hiromu Arakawa. The series follows young hunter Yuru, who awakens two ancient guardians called "Daemons", which he uses to protect his village. He explores the outside world to understand the truth behind his missing sister, Asa. The first season aired from April to September 2026 on Tokyo MX and other networks. A second season has been announced.

The series was directed by Masahiro Andō and written by Noboru Takagi. The team worked on the anime to be faithful to the source material while carefully expanding content. Crunchyroll licensed the series for an English release.

Critical reception has been positive due to the production values of Bones Film and the way fight scenes and drama are blended. Critics also praised the early plot twists presented in the story.

== Synopsis ==
Set in a world where certain humans can control a duo of supernatural creatures called Daemons, twins Yuru and Asa, "born between day and night" in a premodern Higashi village, are prophesied to wield great power. As a teenager, Yuru learns that he was separated from his sister at a young age, and that the Higashi village has been cut off from the now modern world (called "Lowlands" by the villagers) for centuries, where Asa grew up. Along the way to find each other, the twins learn of their abilities to control all Daemons and eventually discover they must unite to save the world from destruction.

== Production ==
The anime adaptation was primarily written by Noboru Takagi, who had previously worked at Bones prior to his involvement with Daemons of the Shadow Realm. Bones approached Takagi to collaborate on the project. He was drawn to the manga's simultaneous treatment of ordinary life and supernatural events, believing that this balance enriched the original series' storytelling and ensured a consistent tone. From the outset, the staff aimed to remain faithful to the source material, with only minor deviations. The series was directed by Masahiro Ando, who frequently suggested expanding certain moments from the manga to create cliffhangers while still honoring the original work.

Early in production, the team agreed on a 24‑episode run, a decision they found challenging as it required careful planning for a suitable conclusion or climax. Determining these cliffhangers placed considerable pressure on Takagi during the writing process. In hindsight, he expressed admiration for Hiromu Arakawa's writing, particularly its originality. Although the staff had no prior knowledge of Yuru and Asa's eventual character arcs when the anime began, they suspected that the series' title indicated the pair would become pivotal figures. By the second episode, Takagi was already impressed by the studio's work on the series.

=== Cast ===
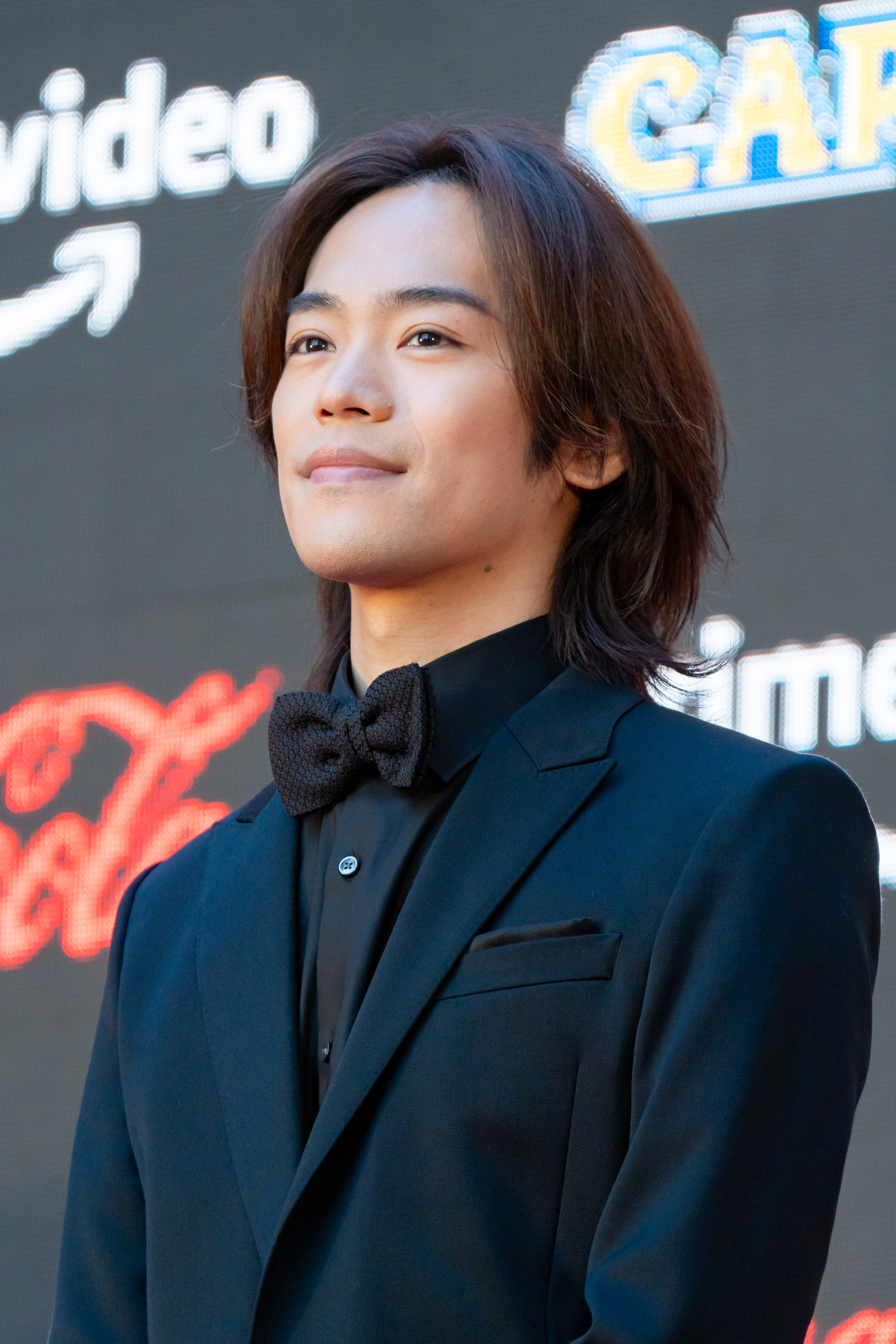
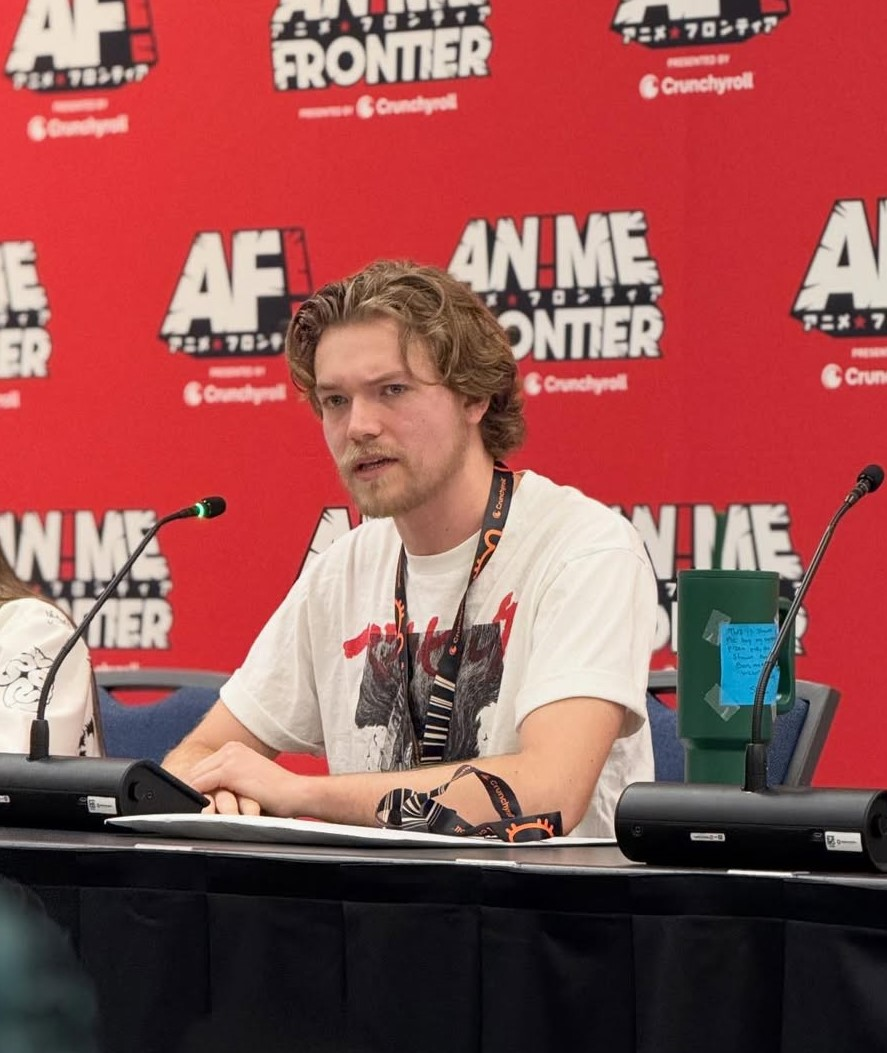
Kensho Ono (left) and Ben Stegmair (right) provided the Japanese and English voice of Yuru, respectively.

The two lead characters, Yuru and Asa, were voiced by Kensho Ono and Yume Miyamoto, respectively. During his audition, Ono was unfamiliar with the series but began reading it upon learning that its author had written Fullmetal Alchemist. He noted that the protagonist often behaved comically when confronted with the modern world, a trait stemming from his mountain upbringing, and he enjoyed this aspect of the character. He found the first two episodes particularly challenging because Yuru was constantly confused by the events in his village, though he ultimately expressed satisfaction with the recording process. Miyamoto, meanwhile, learned of the manga through a longtime high school friend. Regarding Asa's character, she initially struggled with her performance until sound director Kazuhiro Wakabayashi suggested that Asa's early behavior reflected an attempt to suppress her feelings for her brother. Miyamoto found the series demanding due to the need to balance serious moments with comedy.

In the English dub of the series, Yuru is voiced by Ben Stegmair. He was guided by fellow director Shawn Gann in how to portray the character. He claimed having "three Yurus"; a calm one, an innocent one exploring the world, and then a protector who acts like a hunter. Gann supported Stegmair's ideas afterwards. Stegmair had already read the manga in 2021 and grew attached to it thanks to Arakawa's storytelling. Stegmair was supported by his fellow actors when dealing with the parts where Yuru is shocked by the world. Asa's voice actress in the English dub is Molly Zhang who enjoyed doing the two versions of her character appearing in the anime. Upon watching the first episode of the series, Zhang was shocked by the story which allowed her to be more familiar with her role.

== Release ==
The series was announced during Crunchyroll's panel at Anime Expo in July 2025. The series is produced by Bones Film and directed by Masahiro Andō, with Noboru Takagi handling series composition, and Nobuhiro Arai designing the characters. The first season aired from April 4 to September 19, 2026, on Tokyo MX and other networks, running for two consecutive cours. The episodes are being collected into eight Blu-ray and DVD sets, which are set to be released from July 8, 2026, to February 10, 2027.

Immediately following the first season's finale, a second season was announced.

The music for the series was composed by Kenichiro Suehiro. The original soundtrack album is set to release on September 16, 2026. The first opening theme song is "Tobu Toki" (飛ぶ時; lit. 'Time to Fly'), performed by Vaundy, while the first ending theme song is "Tobō yo" (飛ぼうよ; lit. 'Let's Fly'), performed by Yama. The second opening theme song is "Back Shot", performed by Masanori Otoda, while the second ending theme song is "Kujaku" (孔雀; lit. 'Peacock'), performed by Kei Sugawara.

Crunchyroll is streaming the series. Netflix and Hulu also began streaming the series on July 4, 2026. Muse Communication licensed the series in Southeast Asia.

== Episodes ==
No.	Title	Directed by	Written by	Storyboarded by	Animation directed by	Original release date
1	"Asa and Yuru"; Transliteration: "Asa to Yuru" (Japanese: アサとユル)	Koji Nagatomi	Noboru Takagi	Masahiro Andō	Yoshiyuki Itō	April 4, 2026
A woman gives birth to twin babies, the children are born divided day and night have the power to control Daemons. Yuru trains himself to be a hunter for his remote mountain village, while his twin sister Asa lives in captivity due to village tradition. Despite the village struggling financially, Yuru refuses to leave the village like his parents did in order to stay with Asa. However, one day, the magical barrier protecting the village is suddenly shattered as a military force attacks, slaughtering many of the villagers as a young girl with supernatural powers named Gabby leads the charge to capture Yuru. Yuru takes a secret passage to the village keep to protect Asa, only to see her killed by a woman who claims that she is the real Asa. A traveling merchant, Dera, kills most of the soldiers and evades Gabby, whose powers stem from a Daemon she controls. Upon reaching the keep, Dera is ordered by the village elder to escape with Yuru. Dera complies and takes Yuru to the statues of the village's twin guardian deities, Left and Right. Using a special medallion and Yuru's blood, Dera awakens Left and Right, who are both Daemons. They destroy the two military helicopters attacking the village, and pledge their fealty to Yuru.
2	"Right and Left"; Transliteration: "Migi to Hidari" (Japanese: 右と左)	Shōji Ikeno	Noboru Takagi	Masahiro Andō	Hiroki Kanno, Mio Araki & Maho Satsuki	April 11, 2026
Yuru orders Left and Right to help him and the village. Right leaves to save the surviving villagers while Left battles Gabby's Daemon, giving Yuru the opportunity to wound Gabby with his bow. The second Asa catches up with them and saves Gabby, while Right arrives and confirms this Asa is the real one. Asa explains that she escaped the village with their parents ten years ago, and the villagers created an imposter Asa in a bid to keep Yuru from leaving the village as well. Happy to see that Yuru is actually alive, Asa agrees to a truce and withdraws with Gabby. They are evacuated by their associate Jin, who is concerned when he hears Dera is involved. Dera leads Yuru away from the village and links up with his partner Hana, explaining they are both Daemon retainers and the forces that attacked them were likely from the rival Kagemori clan. After a rare encounter with the Daemon Oshirasama, Yuru is taken to a modern city at the foot of the mountain.
3	"Dera and Hana"; Transliteration: "Dera to Hana" (Japanese: デラとハナ)	Kōsuke Shimotori	Noboru Takagi	Jong Heo	Ayumi Abe & Tsubasa Hatashima	April 18, 2026
The group stops at a rest stop to catch their breath. Since his cover has been blown, Dera suggests to Hana that they pose as a married couple with Yuru as their child to make it easier to hide. Yuru privately asks Left and Right if Asa's story is true, and they confirm they witnessed his parents flee the village with Asa while standing guard at the village entrance. As the group leaves the rest stop, Dera explains the Kagemori clan consists of villagers who split off to live in the modern world. Furthermore, Left and Right explain that Yuru and Asa are twins who "divide day and night", meaning they are prophesized to bring great upheaval to the world. As one of the twins, Asa has apparently already mastered the power of "Break", the ability to destroy any object she wishes, while Yuru's power has yet to manifest. Dera also points out Yuru's mother was a hiker who got lost and accidentally wandered into the village. Eventually, the group decides to settle down in Guntama Prefecture. As they get accustomed to life in the modern world, Yuru declares to Left and Right that he will find Asa so he can get answers about what happened to their parents.
4	"Jin and Yuru"; Transliteration: "Jin to Yuru" (Japanese: ジンとユル)	Koji Nagatomi	Shingo Irie	Koji Nagatomi	Kana Miyai	April 25, 2026
Dera and Hana rent out an apartment and Hana introduces her own Daemons, Kotetsu and Jiro. At the Kagemori mansion, Gabby is still recovering from her wounds while Asa is ordered to stay put for her own protection. Jin is assigned to search for Yuru and uses a sample of Asa's blood to draw Left and Right's attention. He also uses a body double created by his Daemon, Scavenger, to lure Yuru into a trap. Realizing Yuru is missing, Dera and Hana have Kotetsu and Jiro track him down and are shocked that he has gone all the way to Tokyo. Despite Yuru being taken prisoner, Left and Right attack Jin and his men, who fight back with a combination of conventional weapons and their own Daemons. Yuru takes advantage of the distraction to take Jin hostage, and asks him if the Kagemori were really responsible for the attack on the village. Jin claims responsibility, and Yuru barely manages to maintain self control not to kill him, instead demanding that he meet face to face with Asa.
5	"Hare and Tortoise"; Transliteration: "Usagi to Kame" (Japanese: 兎と亀)	Shōji Ikeno & Ai Hasegawa	Chiaki Konaka	Hideyo Yamamoto	Mio Araki, Maho Satsuki, Hiroki Kanno & Kana Miyai	May 2, 2026
Jin agrees to Yuru's demands and convinces him to come to the Kagemori manor. Dera and Hana track Yuru's location to the manor, and Dera heads out to retrieve him. Asa gladly greets Yuru, who still tries to maintain his distance and asks her what happened to their parents. Asa and Jin explain that after leaving the village, their parents left Asa in the Kagemori Clan's care while they decided to travel to Okinawa. However, during the flight, both parents along with their bodyguard disappeared without a trace. Yuru suspects betrayal from the Kagemori, but Asa declares she trusts them because they have protected her against assassins sent from the village. Suddenly, two unknown Daemons attack the manor, targeting both Yuru and Asa. Determined to stand and fight, Yuru obtains a bow and arrows from Jin and fires at the attacking Daemons.
6	"The Kagemori Clan and the Unknown Assailants"; Transliteration: "Kagemori-ke to Nazo no Shūgeki-sha" (Japanese: 影森家と謎の襲撃者)	Shō Kitamura	Daishirō Tanimura	Koji Nagatomi	Yoshiyuki Itō	May 9, 2026
Yuru's shot misses due to his inexperience with the new bow. When he and Asa team up to fight the pair of Daemons, it combines into a single one and seals them in separate barriers. Asa finds herself in a realm of complete darkness and begins succumbing to her fear of the dark until Right arrives and reassures her. He reveals that he and Left were chosen specifically by the village to control the twins, since Right can neutralize Break while Left can neutralize Seal, making him and Left Asa and Yuru's natural enemies, respectively. Asa uses Break to destroy the barrier holding her, and then breaks the unknown Daemon's contract with its master and takes their place, taming the Daemon. It releases Yuru, who works together with the Kagemori guards to round up all of the attackers. Unfortunately, none of the attackers know the identity of the group that hired them, leaving Yuru and Asa with no leads on what happened to their parents. Yuru then asks Asa why she wears an eyepatch over her right eye, and she admits that she was resurrected after having been killed by an assassin sent by the village.
7	"Asa and Break"; Transliteration: "Asa to "Kai"" (Japanese: アサと｢解｣)	Katsuya Yamamoto & Masahiro Andō	Noboru Takagi	Jong Heo	Ayumi Abe, Kyōko Kotani & Mami Horimoto	May 16, 2026
Yuru recalls a time from his childhood where a bandit attempted to murder him during a hunting trip. His father instructed him not to tell anybody about the attack, and later that night, his parents fled with Asa. Asa meanwhile explains that shortly after she joined the Kagemori Clan, she was captured by assassins from the village who killed her by slitting her throat. She then found herself in a realm between life and death, where the Daemon Break gave Asa a choice: either accept her death, or choose life and gain the power of Break. Despite warnings that people will try to exploit her as a tool, Asa decided to keep living so she could find Yuru. She then revived herself and used Break to kill her captors. Dera arrives with the Kagemori patriarch, Gonzo, and Yuru asks them if he can gain Seal if he were to die. Dera confirms it, but warns that resurrection is not guaranteed, as one of the previous twins who died did not come back. Gonzo then suggests that they all have breakfast first before continuing further.
8	"Suspicion and Conviction"; Transliteration: "Ginen to Kakushin" (Japanese: 疑念と確信)	Daigo Yamagishi	Noboru Takagi	Junichi Sakata	Takashi Yokoyama, Kana Miyai & Yoshiyuki Itō	May 23, 2026
Yuru and Dera are introduced to Gonzo's sons, Hagure, Asuma, and Jin. As they eat breakfast, both Gonzo and Dera try to blame the attack on the mansion on each other's clans. When asked about his intentions for the twins, Gonzo explains he wishes to completely destroy the village so no more twins will be born and end the village's ambition to dominate the world. However, Asuma expresses interest in wielding the power of the twins for the greater good. Determined not to live in hiding, Yuru declares that he will gladly challenge anybody that tries to come after him, whether they be from the village, the Kagemori clan, or anybody else. Asa is concerned since Yuru has not experienced being constantly hunted, and entrusts his safety to Dera, Right, and Left. The Kagemori agree to collaborate with Yuru to find his parents. As Yuru takes his leave, Asa assures him that their parents felt guilty they were unable to bring him with them, and she bids him farewell. Yuru finally comes to accept that this Asa is his real sister as he heads home to an uncertain future.
9	"Embrace and Whisper"; Transliteration: "Hōyō to Sasayaki" (Japanese: 抱擁と囁き)	Haruka Yoshinaga	Shingo Irie	Jong Heo	Takashi Yokoyama, Maho Satsuki, Shō Chikaraishi & Momoka Miyagawa	May 30, 2026
Dera takes the opportunity to show Yuru more of the modern world while buying supplies for him at a department store. Yuru recalls that he had to kill several "bandits" that attacked him back when he lived in the village, and he now realizes they were assassins from the outside world. He and Dera then notice that they are being followed. Back at the Kagemori manor, the Kagemoris continue to investigate the attack by questioning their prisoners, who explain that they were let inside the manor through a secret entrance. Determining that the prisoners are just freelance mercenaries that do not have any ties to the mastermind, Gonzo decides to induct them into the clan as low level soldiers to keep an eye on them. Asa decides to keep her new Daemons, Yin-Yang, after they refuse to return to their old master. Outside, Dera leads Yuru to his old hideout where they stock up on weapons and ambush the three agents following them. Before they can question the agents, a pair of demons called Tenaga-Ashinaga attack and kill two of the agents before Right and Left step forward to battle them.
10	"Long-Arm and Long-Leg"; Transliteration: "Tenaga to Ashinaga" (Japanese: 手長と足長)	Shō Kitamura	Chiaki Konaka	Masahiro Andō	Ayumi Abe, Mio Araki, Kana Miyai, Seina Koizumi, Kyōko Kotani, Takashi Yokoyama & Mami Horimoto	June 6, 2026
Tenaga and Ashinaga recognize Right and Left as being the Daemons responsible for sealing them away one thousand years ago, with the help of a Seal user. Realizing Tenaga and Ashinga seek revenge, Dera claims he is their master to keep their attention off of Yuru. As Right and Left battle the Daeomons, Yuru and Dera interrogate the last remaining agent, who admits that she is following them on the orders of Asuma. Yuru and the agent then split up to try and find Tenaga and Ashinaga's master while Dera uses a high powered rifle to shoot out Ashinaga's eyes. Tenaga and Ashinaga combine into a single form and capture the agent, who blurts out that Yuru is Right and Left's true master. Tenaga-Ashinaga then focus their attacks on Yuru, but he bluffs them by faking the hand sign to cast Seal, which causes them to hesitate long enough for Right and Left to separate and destroy them with Dera's assistance. Left then catches a butterfly that has been following them, and the agent confirms that it is a part of Asuma's Daemon that had been secretly following them.
11	"Big Brother and Little Brother"; Transliteration: "Ani to Otōto" (Japanese: 兄と弟)	Ikurō Satō	Daishirō Tanimura	Shinji Ishihira	Hiroki Kanno, Tsubasa Hatashima & Kyōko Takeuchi	June 13, 2026
Yuru is able to find Tenaga-Ashinaga's master who is hiding underneath Dera's hideout. The master identifies himself as Tadera Ken, the son of Dera's father Tadera Roei which makes them half brothers. Ken reveals that Roei was the person who taught Yuru and Asa's parents how to escape the village's barrier, after being blackmailed by their mother, Nagisa. However, Ken does not know the location of their parents, and Roei also disappeared after they escaped the village. With his mother having passed away and nowhere else to go, Ken contracted with Tenaga-Ashinaga to have strong Daemons at his disposal, but could not control them so his only option was to trap them in Dera's Lost House. With Ken having nowhere else to go, Dera takes him in and he and Hana find out Roei is still making deposits into Ken's bank account, meaning he is still alive. As Yuru and Ken rest for the night, Dera and Hana make arrangements to have Ken's mother's ashes buried.
12	"Retainer and Shaman"; Transliteration: "Tsugaikomono to Kitōshi" (Japanese: 番(つがい)小者と祈祷師)	Koji Nagatomi	Noboru Takagi	Koji Nagatomi	Shō Chikaraishi, Maho Satsuki, Tsubasa Hatashima, Tsunenori Saitō, Arisa Ozaki & Momoka Miyagawa	June 20, 2026
As Yuru crafts arrows for his bow, Ken asks him to teach him how to use weapons so he can grow stronger. Jin investigates reports that the intruders entered the manor through the west gate, which should not exist. He does not find the gate, but finds a pair of fine cuts in the wall. Elsewhere, Asuma meets with his uncle Shingo, who wants to take control of the twins and was behind the attack on the Kagemori manor. He has also hired swordsman Ivan Yosano, who wields a pair of Daemon katanas. Yuru continues the search for his parents and suggests finding his maternal grandparents in Okinawa, but Dera advises against it. Asa has a phone call with her grandmother and confirms the latter is being mind controlled by a Daemon. With no other leads, Dera visits one of his contacts, the Shaman, but he does not know Roei's location. The Shaman then transports a shipment of medicine to the village. The villagers wonder if they should have awakened Seal earlier, but the Shaman reminds them that the "bandits" that were sent after Yuru were all killed. Suddenly, Ivan cuts himself out of the Shaman's body using his Daemon katanas, and begins slaughtering the villagers.
13	"Daikyo and Shokyo"; Transliteration: "Daikyō to Shōkyō" (Japanese: 大凶と小凶)	Hiroshi Shimizu	Shingo Irie	Hiroshi Shimizu	Yoshiyuki Itō, Takashi Yokoyama, Hiroki Kanno & Asahi Takeuchi	July 4, 2026
Ivan fights his way to the village keep, where he encounters the Fake Asa and is able to subdue her with his twin Daemon katanas Shokyo and Daikyo. He threatens the Fake Asa to follow his orders in return for sparing her master's life, and kidnaps both her and a young village girl as a hostage. Meanwhile, Yuru's friend Danji witnesses the carnage with his mother. Realizing the village is likely doomed, Danji's mother orders him to go down the mountain and hide with Yuru, giving him directions to pass the barrier. Danji reaches the bottom of the mountain and encounters Oshirasama, who offers to help him find Yuru after receiving permission from her master. Hana receives a notification that the Shaman and his Daemons were murdered, with a message carved his body demanding Yuru appear to negotiate the release of the Fake Asa and the hostage. After burying the Shaman, Hana is left conflicted on whether to tell Yuru and Dera about the message.
14	"Family and Friends"; Transliteration: "Kazoku to Tomo" (Japanese: 家族と友)	Yukihiko Asaki	Chiaki Konaka	Jong Heo	Tomoyo Nakayama, Yūta Ohara, Kenji Hachizaki, Ikkō Inaguma, Satomi Kani & Shinya Yamada	July 11, 2026
After returning home, Hana decides to tell Dera about the message left on the Shaman's body and the second attack on the village. Intrigued at the identity of the attacker, Dera asks Jin for assistance in his investigation. Meanwhile, Yuru, Ken, Left, and Right look for somewhere isolated enough to practice their archery. They notice they are being followed by Daemons and lure them into the wilderness before confronting them. The Daemons reveal they are a pair of nearly forgotten local gods from Noto, who inadvertently formed a contract with a stray dog. Given that the Daemons are harmless, Left and Right agree to be friends with them. Oshirasama and Danji then arrive, but Yuru realizes Danji is also a Daemon due to him lacking a shadow. Danji admits he is paired with the Fake Asa, and they are in reality Zashiki-Warashi. Their true master is not the village elder Granny Yamaha, but instead Danji's "mother" Kyoka. Shocked that he had been lied to by the village for so long, Yuru decides to retreat into the mountains alone to clear his head.
15	"Yuru and Danji"; Transliteration: "Yuru to Danji" (Japanese: ユルとダンジ)	Tomoyo Kamoi & Shōji Ikeno	Daishirō Tanimura	Tomoyo Kamoi	Ayumi Abe, Miyuki Koga, Seina Koizumi, Kyōko Kotani, Kana Miyai & Mio Araki	July 18, 2026
Yuru tries to calm down and recalls his past with Danji, and still wonders if the kindness Danji showed him was genuine or not. After he returns, Danji had already left to search for the fake Asa. Dera then informs Yuru about the mysterious ransom request, and they decide to head to the meeting point to capture the hostage taker. Meanwhile, Jin relays the intelligence he traded with Dera to the Kagemoris. Gonzo then leaves the estate with Gabby and two of his bodyguards, Natsuki and Fuyuki. At the meeting point, Yuru, Dera, Left, and Right stake out the warehouse the trade is supposed to take place. However, Yuru is ambushed and kidnapped by Daemon made out of butterflies. Left and Right give chase, but Ivan teleports it and Yuru away to Asuma and Shingo. Asuma admits he wants to control the power of Seal, and offers to kill Yuru to unlock. Back at the warehouse, Dera, Left, and Right confront Ivan, who decides to kill Left to prevent her from interfering with Seal.
16	"Kagemori and Shingo"; Transliteration: "Kagemori to Shingō" (Japanese: 影森と新郷)	Koji Nagatomi	Noboru Takagi	Koji Nagatomi	Kōichi Horikawa, Kenji Mizuhata & Masaki Hinata	July 25, 2026
Left and Right detect the smell of Yuru's parents' blood on Ivan's swords and decide to try and capture him. Tadera disengages and reluctantly teams up with a surviving village bandit to look for Yuru. Meanwhile, Shingo and Asuma try to convince Yuru to join their faction so Yuru can freely use the power of Seal. However, Yuru refuses to associate with them and reiterates his desire to remain neutral and live a normal life. Gonzo then personally begins attacking Shingo's business holdings in an effort to flush him out, with nobody able to stop him due to the sheer number of Daemons he has under his command. Back at the Kagemori mansion, Asa continues assisting Hagure with his manga, though she longs to see Yuru again. Akio then arrives while she is alone and begins approaching her threateningly, causing Asa to warn him to stay away from her.
17	"Crybaby and Naughty Child"; Transliteration: "Nakuko to Warui Ko" (Japanese: 泣く子と悪い子)	Shō Kitamura	Shingo Irie	Jong Heo	Yoshiyuki Itō, Tsunenori Saitō, Hiroki Kanno, Maho Satsuki, Takashi Yokoyama, Shō Chikaraishi & Momoka Miyagawa	August 1, 2026
Shingo's men attempt to ambush Natsuki and Fuyuki only for Natsuki to reveal herself as Asa in disguise and use Break to neutralize their Daemons' contracts. Gonzo uses his Daemons, Hyakki Yako, to form contracts with the Daemons Asa freed. Shingo becomes distracted by Gonzo's attack, giving Yuru the opportunity to take him hostage. At the mansion, the Asa there is Ai-chan in disguise who bites Akio's arm off. Jin, Gabby, and Haruo then confront Akio, having already deduced that he is a traitor. Akio has his Daemon pair Mountain God battle against Jin, Gabby, and Haruo, but they are no match for Gabriel. Akio tries to spare Mountain God from additional harm by breaking their contract, and Gabby almost kills him in a rage before being stopped by the real Natsuki, allowing Akio to be captured. At Shingo's office, Yuru attempts to negotiate the release of the hostages, but Shingo is able to break free and stun Yuru with his Daemons Fujin and Raijin.
18	"Fujin and Raijin"; Transliteration: "Fūjin to Raijin" (Japanese: 風神と雷神)	Daigo Yamagishi	Daishirō Tanimura	Daigo Yamagishi	Mio Araki, Arisa Itō, Kyōko Kotani, Kana Miyai, Arisa Ozaki, Hikaru; Sato, Miyuki Koga, Ayumi Abe, Tsubasa Hatashima & Mami Horimoto	August 8, 2026
Dera and the bandit leader follow one of Shingo's henchmen to his office, where they attempt rescue Yuru. However, Asuma orders his Daemon Yozakura to take Yuru away against Shingo's orders. Dera chases after Yozakura and leaves the bandit leader to face Shingo alone. Once at a safe distance away, Yozakura releases Yuru and he explains to Dera that everything is part of Asuma's plot to take down Shingo since he is tired of being exploited by him. Yozakura also points out that he and Asagiri are powerless against Fujin and Raijin, which is why they have not been able to openly rebel against Shingo. Dera confirms that Jin also advised him to consider Asuma an ally. Meanwhile, Fake Asa manages to make contact with Danji and tells him the location where she and the other hostage are being held. Danji sends a village smoke signal to attract Yuru's attention, but Yuru is conflicted between saving the hostages or capturing Ivan to get answers about his parents. Asa also notices the smoke signal and responds first, hoping to find Yuru but is disappointed to only find the hostages.
19	"Sword and Bow"; Transliteration: "Katana to Yumi" (Japanese: 刀と弓)	Hiroshi Shimizu	Chiaki Konaka	Hiroshi Shimizu	Tsubasa Hatashima, Seina Koizumi, Atsushi Hasebe, Takashi Yokoyama, Kaho; Ogi, Shō Chikaraishi, Hiroki Kanno, Takahiro Komori & Momoka Miyagawa	August 15, 2026
Asa neutralizes Shingo's guards and stores the hostages inside Yin-Yang for safekeeping, though she demands the Fake Asa to reveal the full truth to Yuru later. Seeing the hostages are safe, Yuru decides to go after Ivan while Dera tips off Gonzo about Shingo's location. Meanwhile, a security guard finds the bodies of the bandits Ivan killed and reports the discovery to the police. Yuru and Dera then join Right and Left in fighting Ivan, who is still managing to hold out against their attacks. Yuru is able to strike Ivan's leg with an arrow and demands that he surrender, pointing out that Shingo is being dealt with by the Kagemoris. Ivan instead claims that he killed Yuru's parents in an attempt to provoke him, but Yuru recalls his father's training and Asa's assurance they are still alive, and manages to calm himself down. Realizing he is backed into a corner, Ivan unleashes the full power of his Daemons in a last ditch attempt to kill Left.
20	"The Hunted and the Hunter"; Transliteration: "Tōbō-sha to Tsuiseki-sha" (Japanese: 逃亡者と追跡者)	Shōji Ikeno	Shingo Irie	Jong Heo	Yoshiyuki Itō, Kana Miyai, Kyōko Kotani, Mio Araki, Maho Satsuki, Tsunenori Saitō, Arisa Ozaki, Seina Sato & Asahi Takeuchi	August 22, 2026
Despite his increased power, Ivan is unable to finish off Left and is forced to retreat. With Yuru, Right, and Left all wounded, they have no choice but to let him escape. While Shingo is distracted interrogating the bandit leader, Asuma takes the opportunity to capture him, intending to question him about his accomplices. However, Ivan returns and kills Shingo as well as Fujin and Raijin to silence them. He attempts to kill Asuma as well, but his body begins to suffer the side effects of using his full power, and he retreats. Ivan then meets up with one of his accomplices from Nishino Village, who helps clean up the bodies of the bandits before the police arrive. The bandit leader also escapes in the confusion before Kagemori reinforcements arrive. Yuru links up with Asa, and they and Danji enter Yin-Yang to privately confront the fake Asa together.
21	"Zashiki-Warashi and Higashi Village"; Transliteration: "Zashiki-warashi to Higashi-mura" (Japanese: ザシキワラシと東村)	Shinya Iino	Daishirō Tanimura	Shinya Iino	Ayumi Abe, Shō Chikaraishi, Arisa Ozaki, Atsushi Hasebe, Takahiro Komori, Takashi Yokoyama & Momoka Miyagawa	August 29, 2026
Inside Yin-Yang, Yuru and Asa confront Danji and the fake Asa, who reveals her true name is Kiri. They explain that they used to live in Higashi Village 400 years ago, but fell dormant after their master never returned from the Battle of Sekigahara. They remained dormant until they were found by Roei, who arranged to have Kyoka adopt them as if they were her own children. They witnessed Nagisa and Mine marry and give birth to Yuru and Asa, but after they fled with Asa, Kiri was ordered to impersonate Asa while Kyoka secretly had Danji watch over Yuru. Yuru asks Asa to release Danji and Kiri, but before leaving, Danji assures Yuru that Asa never killed anybody from the village. Alone with Asa, Yuru then asks her what she desires, and she reveals she simply wants to live a normal with Yuru and their parents. Yuru promises they will make it a reality, and come up with a plan to capture Ivan.
22	"The Kagemori Brothers and the Kuroya Siblings"; Transliteration: "Kagemori Kyōdai to Kuroya Kyōdai" (Japanese: 影森兄弟と黒谷(や)姉弟)	Haruka Yoshinaga, Tomoyo Kamoi & Koji Nagatomi	Chiaki Konaka & Noboru Takagi	Tomoyo Kamoi	Tsubasa Hatashima, Seina Koizumi, Arisa Itō, Maho Satsuki, Tsunenori Saitō, Kana Miyai, Mio Araki, Yoshiyuki Itō, Kyōko Kotani & Hiroki Kanno	September 5, 2026
In a flashback, Gonzo comes across Azuma's future mother Iori, who is contemplating suicide due to being cast out of the Shingo family. Gonzo instead offers a place for her in the Kagemori Clan. In the present, Asa convinces Yuru to come with her to the Kagemori manor to get his wounds treated, and Gonzo wishes to interrogate Akio about his treason. At the manor, Jin tells a disheartened Naruo that Akio will be executed by Gonzo for treason. Natsuki pleads to Akio to explain his betrayal, and he admits he always felt a distance from everybody due to his inability to feel pain but managed to contact who he believed to be his parents. He also cryptically warns them not to try and interrogate Mountain God or it would result in the Daemons' destruction. Yamakaze's relic then suddenly explodes before it can be captured, while Tanikaze's relic approaches the infirmary where Akio is being held and prepares to explode as well.
23	"Emotion and Reason"; Transliteration: "Jō to Kotowari" (Japanese: 情と理(ことわり))	Shō Kitamura & Daigo Yamagishi	Noboru Takagi	Jong Heo & Shinya Iino	Takashi Yokoyama, Tsunenori Saitō, Takahiro Komori, Kana Miyai, Ayumi Abe, Shō Chikaraishi, Yoshiyuki Itō, Arisa Ozaki & Momoka Miyagawa	September 12, 2026
Akio manages to escape custody in the confusion caused by Tanikaze's explosion and is rescued by his mother. Gonzo is informed of the situation and immediately orders Asa to return to the manor with him. Yuru is struck down by a fever, so Dera takes him back to their apartment to recover. He also ends up bringing Danji, Kiri, and the other hostage, Azami. Hana reluctantly allows Azami to stay in the apartment, since it would be too dangerous to send her back to Higashi Village. Bunbun then recalls seeing Yamakaze and Tanikaze's relics having some sort of slime mold attached to them, and remembers that there is a Daemon from western Japan that has an ability like that. Elsewhere, a group of Daemon Wielders continue to plot to take advantage of the conflict between the Kagemoris and Higashi Village so that the West may achieve supremacy.
24	"Higashi Village and Nishino Village"; Transliteration: "Higashi-mura to Nishino-mura" (Japanese: 東村と西ノ村)	Koji Nagatomi & Masahiro Andō	Noboru Takagi	Masahiro Andō	See note for the ADs (Note: Seina Koizumi, Takashi Yokoyama, Maho Satsuki, Kana Miyai, Asahi Takeuchi, Kaho Ogi, Mio Araki, SEOB, Arisa Itō, Tsubasa Hatashima, Arisa Ozaki, Kyōko Kotani, Shō Chikaraishi, Takahiro Komori, Ayumi Abe, Hiroki Kanno, Yoshiyuki Itō, Mami Horimoto & Momoka Miyagawa)	September 19, 2026
The Kagemoris are left reeling at Akio's betrayal. Asa feels responsible for all of the damage caused, but Gabby insists none of it is her fault. While recovering, Yuru has a nightmare about having to kill a bandit in self defense and disposing of the body. He eventually wakes up from his fever and learns from Dera and Hana that a meeting has been called for all of the highest ranking officers of the Higashi Village bandits. Dera opts not to go due to his wanted status, so Hana attends the meeting instead to spy for him. The leader of the bandits, the "President" arrives at the meeting. He announces that since most of the individuals that know how to cross the Higashi Village barrier are now dead or missing, they are cut off from Granny Yamaha's orders, so he will take full command of the bandits. However, Hana's Daemon Jiro finds a pair of infected Daemon relics at the meeting site, which explode. Back at the manor, Jin warns Gonzo that Akio may be working for Nishino Village, though Gonzo remains skeptical since Nishino Village was destroyed long ago.

== Reception ==
=== Critical response ===
The anime adaptation has received positive reviews from critics. Both Anime News Network and Esquire listed the series among the best anime of 2026, with both publications commending its unexpected premise and polished production values.

Critics highlighted the plot twists of the early episodes, which subverted expectations by revealing advanced technology within the ostensibly rustic setting of protagonist Yuru's village. Tony Sun Prickett of Anime Feminist drew comparisons between the series and Demon Slayer: Kimetsu no Yaiba and The Elusive Samurai, observing that all three featured protagonists who lived peacefully until a shocking event forced them to flee their homes; however, the reviewer refrained from disclosing the full extent of the twist. Prickett also praised Yuru's character design as consistent with Hiromu Arakawa's established archetypes. Rafael Motomayor of IGN similarly noted that Yuru's life was upended by a violent external attack, compelling him to wield supernatural powers in a manner reminiscent of the debut of Attack on Titan. Polygon acclaimed the early twists, particularly the revelation of the true nature of Yuru's existence as he encountered unfamiliar modern technology outside his mountain home—a device likened to the effective twists in M. Night Shyamalan's films. The review drew parallels to the isekai genre, wherein a character discovers a new world, though in Yuru's case the dynamic was reversed, as the audience was familiar with the modern world that the protagonist did not know. Collider meanwhile compared it to the 2003 Fullmetal Alchemist adaptation which followed a different path of Arakawa's narrative and had the protagonist Edward Elric finding himself trapped in Germany during the 20th Century. Although Edward's arc was compared as "jumping the shark" in regards to how poorly this twist was received, Collider found Yuru's story engaging instead.

Moumita Chakraborty of FandomWire praised Yuru's characterization, describing him as an intelligent fighter who relied on strategy rather than brute force, while also demonstrating a strong bond with his two Tsugai that led to a well-earned victory against an antagonist. Richard Einsbeins of Anime News Network commended the development of his complex relationship with his true sister Asa, whom he learned to care for by the 21st episode. Although Mariló Delgado of Espinof praised Bones' animation in environmental and action sequences, she observed that the series did not attain the level of execution for which Demon Slayer and Jujutsu Kaisen were known.

=== Accolades ===
At the 16th Newtype Anime Awards in 2026, the anime won Best Work (TV/Streaming) category while winning three other awards: Best Director for Masahiro Andō, Best Character Design for Nobuhiro Arai, and Best Theme Song for "Tobu Toki" by Vaundy. The series also placed in other categories with Noboru Takagi, Kenichiro Suehiro, and Yuru came in second place for screenplay, soundtrack, and male character award respectively, while Asa and Bones Film placed fourth and third in female character and studio categories.
