= Kamen Rider Saber Spin-Off: Kamen Rider Sabela & Durendal =

- Promotional poster
- Japanese: 仮面ライダーセイバー（聖刃）スピンオフ 仮面ライダーサーベラ＆仮面ライダーデュランダル
- Directed by: Hiroki Kashiwagi
- Written by: Kaori Kaneko
- Starring: Mei Angela; Ken Shonozaki; Hiroshi Yazaki; Yuki Ikushima; Eiji Togashi; Yume Miyamoto
- Production company: Toei
- Distributed by: Toei
- Release date: November 20, 2022
- Country: Japan
- Language: Japanese

Kamen Rider Saber Spin-Off: Kamen Rider Sabela & Durendal (仮面ライダーセイバー（聖刃）スピンオフ 仮面ライダーサーベラ＆デュランダル, Kamen Raidā Seibā Hijiri Ha Supin'Ofu Kamen Raidā Sābera Ando Deyurandaru) is a Japanese superhero spin-off drama of Kamen Rider Saber television series.

== Plot ==
One year has passed after battle days of Sword of Logos ended. Reika Shindai is preparing for her upcoming wedding. However, this happiness is unexpectedly abrupted when her brother, Ryoga Shindai, discovers some disturbing secrets behind the scenes.

== Cast ==
- Mei Angela as Reika Shindai/Kamen Rider Sabela
- Ken Shonozaki as Ryoga Shindai/Kamen Rider Durendal
- Hiroshi Yazaki as Rui Mitarai
- Yuki Ikushima as Ryo Ogami/Kamen Rider Buster
- Tenta Banka as Sora Ogami
- Arisa Nakajima as Haruka Ogami
- Yume Miyamoto as servant lady
- Allen Mary Claire
- Eiji Togashi as Ren Akamichi/Kamen Rider Kenzan

== Release ==
=== Marketing ===
The first footage from the movie was shown on YouTube on October 30, 2022, under the title «Reika Shindai gets married!». The first full trailer of the movie was released on October 6 of the same year, unveiling the movie's title and announcing the release date.

=== Digital ===
Kamen Rider Saber Spin-Off: Kamen Rider Sabela & Durendal was released on Toei Tokusatsu Fan Club on November 20, 2022.
