= Asa (Daemons of the Shadow Realm) =

Fictional character from Daemons of the Shadow Realm

- Daemons of the Shadow Realm character
- Asa by Hiromu Arakawa
- First appearance: Daemons of the Shadow Realm chapter 1: "Asa and Yuru" (December 10, 2021)
- Created by: Hiromu Arakawa
- Voiced by: Japanese; Yume Miyamoto; English; Molly Zhang

Asa (Japanese: アサ) is a fictional character and one of the protagonists from Hiromu Arakawa's manga series Daemons of the Shadow Realm. In the series, Asa is the protagonist Yuru's younger twin sister who left the village at a young age with her parents, and a "False Asa", later revealed to be spiritual being "Daemon" named Kiri. Working for the Kagemori Clan who rescued her, Asa wishes to reconcile with her twin and live a normal life.

Hiromu Arakawa created Asa with the concept of twins, aiming to give both siblings contrasting designs due to tell them apart. Initially, Asa was given an antagonistic characterization, but Arakawa still aimed to give the two siblings become closer. In Japanese, Asa is voiced by Yume Miyamoto while Molly Zhang is in charge of her voice in the English localization.

Critical response to Asa's character was positive for the premise the series gives her and Yuru in regards to their supernatural powers, mirroring Arakawa's previous work in Fullmetal Alchemist as such manga also focused on two siblings. Despite the series' premiere that confused multiple critics as a result of her overly kind feelings towards her twin since they have been split for several years and across the narrative, the two develop a more positive relationship.

== Role in Daemons of the Shadow Realm ==
The twins Yuru and Asa, "born between day and night" in a premodern Higashi village, are prophesied to wield great power. When members from the Kagemori Clan attack the village, Yuru takes a secret passage to the village keep to protect Asa, only to see her killed by a woman who claims that she is the real Asa. Asa explains that she escaped the village with their parents ten years ago, and the villagers created an imposter Asa in a bid to keep Yuru from leaving the village as well. Happy to see that Yuru is actually alive, Asa agrees to a truce and withdraws with her partner Gabby. They are evacuated by their associate Jin, who is concerned when he hears Dera is involved. As a teenager, Yuru learns that he was separated from his sister at a young age, and that the Higashi village has been cut off from the now modern world (called "Lowlands" by the villagers) for centuries, where Asa grew up Although she displays a very tough character. Asa and Jin explain that after leaving the village, their parents left Asa in the Kagemori Clan's care while they decided to travel to Okinawa but went missing.

Asa admits that she was resurrected after having been killed by an assassin sent by the village; After Asa joined the Kagemori Clan, she was captured by assassins from the village who killed her by slitting her throat. She then found herself in a realm between life and death, where the Daemon Break gave Asa a choice: either accept her death, or choose life and gain the power of Break. Despite warnings that people will try to exploit her as a tool, Asa decided to keep living so she could find Yuru. She then revived herself and used Break to kill her captors. Asa is concerned since Yuru has not experienced being constantly hunted, and entrusts his safety to his assistant Ryu Tadera, and the Daemons Right, and Left.

Yuru and Asa the fake Asa, who reveals her true name is Kiri. They explain that they used to live in Higashi Village 400 years ago, but fell dormant after their master never returned from the Battle of Sekigahara. After they fled with Asa, Kiri was ordered to impersonate Asa while Kyoka secretly had Danji watch over Yuru. Yuru asks Asa to release Danji and Kiri, but before leaving, Danji assures Yuru that Asa never killed anybody from the village. Yuru then asks A wsahat she desires, and she reveals she simply wants to live a normal with Yuru and their parents. Yuru promises they will make it a realit.

== Creation ==
The concept of twins was one Hiromu Arakawa had contemplated for some time before the manga Daemons of the Shadow Realm began, and she wanted their origins to resemble mythological narratives, lending them a striking appeal. She considered various possibilities for their ages during the planning phase. To align with Asa's early antagonistic role, Arakawa chose to give her black hair and dark clothing; conversely, Yuru was assigned opposite colors to create a strong contrast. Some aspects of Yuru's personal development drew on Arakawa's own childhood experiences. She did not aim to present a curse narrative per se, but rather to evoke an unsettling atmosphere through the twins' origins. Because Yuru and Asa had been separated for an extended period, Arakawa did not write them as closely bonded siblings. Consequently, she did not regard them as having a conventional brother–sister relationship; instead, she depicted Asa as markedly polite toward Yuru, including the use of Japanese honorifics. Nevertheless, from the outset of the series, Arakawa had already determined that they would eventually develop into genuine equals.

Although the anime staff had no prior knowledge of Yuru and Asa's eventual character arcs when the anime began, they suspected that the series' title indicated the pair would become pivotal figures. By the second episode, Takagi was already impressed by the studio's work on the series.

=== Casting ===
Molly Zhang voices Asa in English

In Japanese, Asa is voiced by Yume Miyamoto. Miyamoto learned of the manga through a longtime high school friend. Regarding Asa's character, she initially struggled with her performance until sound director Kazuhiro Wakabayashi suggested that Asa's early behavior reflected an attempt to suppress her feelings for her brother. Miyamoto found the series demanding due to the need to balance serious moments with comedy.

Asa's voice actress in the English dub is Molly Zhang who enjoyed doing the two versions of her character appearing in the anime. Upon watching the first episode of the series, Zhang was shocked by the story which allowed her to be more familiar with her role. Zhang originally had no idea of the series until being cast. She read the manga thanks to fellow voice actor Alejandro Saab and was amazed by it. She was surprised by Asa's character, finding her scary but eventually a liking to her as her sensitive side was exposed with Asa becoming attached to Yuru. These type of scenes led to Zhang often repeat the word "brother" multiple times in a joyful way in contrast to her first impression. She sees this type of affection as an effective comic relief element while at the same time exposing Asa's loneliness.

== Reception ==
At the 16th Newtype Anime Awards in 2026, Asa placed fourth in the female character. The introduction of the character according to Anime Feminist was felt to be confusing but on purpose to leave Asa's true identity on a mystery the viewer has to discover and why is it that Yuru does not care that one is of them is kept hidden. Polygon said there was a strong potential about what is the identity of Asa and Yuru and how is that their powers can change the world especially because Hiromu Arakawa wrote the series. Rohit Jaiswar from ComicBook.com praised the inclusion of the two twins Asa and Yuru as they are one of the reasons behind Daemons of the Shadow Realm's popularity, attributing such tropes as one of the main reasons behind Fullmetal Alchemist too; The Elric brothers Edward and Alphonse. Jaiswar praised the introduction of Asa and Yuru but as distant siblings who form a soldified bond across the narrative as the former is initially portrayed as a violent individual attacking villagers form the latter's hometown. However, the premise's mysterious situation that becomes more complex the more the viewer watches makes Asa look like a more likable character and creates a striking dynamic with Yuru; While Asa is a young woman living in modern worlds, Yuru becomes an isolated villager who is shocked at the concept of the outside world. The inclusion of a "Fake Asa" further helps to make the story between the two protagonists more interesting. This leads to further potential about the two siblings's relationship which can come across as appealing as the Elrics according to Jaisawr.

Zach Zamora from ScreenRant noticed the series made heavy emphasis on the twins whose names were confused by the Chainsaw Man manga fans for having nearly identical names to two of their protagonists: Yoru and Asa. Zamora said the naming convention Arakawa uses for the two characters contrasts each other as "night and day". The writer also noticed similarities with Demon Slayer: Kimetsu no Yaiba due to the focus on siblings with supernatural powers. Rodrigo Sandoval Lahut from GameRant heavily praised the premise of the importance bertween the two siblings as the two have nearly oppposite backstories despite being twins and having the potential to either protect or destroy the world with the powers they were born with. While both twins show unique talents in the series' beginning, by the time of writing the article Lahut said that there was still not major progress in the manga series to explain well what is the power the two protagonists can develop.

Despite Asa's initial antagonistic behaviour and supernatural powers in the series' premiere, Abema noted that by the series' fifth episode, her character become popular in social media for her sensitive personality. People in social media enjoyed how she turned out to suffer a brother complex as a result of being apart from Yuru from years and the first thing she asks to him upon meeting them in the Kagemori hideout is that if she could hug him only to be denied. Despite Yuru's harsh rejection, Asa continues acting caring towards her distant brother, promising that she will keep helping and is still waiting for another hug. Viewers in X found Asa hilarious as result of the contrast between her cold look and her complex. Richard Einsbeins from Anime News Network praised the development of Yuru's misrelationship with his true sister Asa whom he learns to care for in the 21st episode until learning about her desires and insecurities, which he aims to make reality after separating her from the other Asa he grew up with.
