= Yuru (Daemons of the Shadow Realm) =

Fictional character from Daemons of the Shadow Realm

- Daemons of the Shadow Realm character
- Yuru by Hiromu Arakawa
- First appearance: Daemons of the Shadow Realm chapter 1: "Asa and Yuru" (December 10, 2021)
- Created by: Hiromu Arakawa
- Voiced by: Japanese; Kensho Ono, Kaede Hondo (young); English; Ben Stegmair, Molly Searcy (young)

Yuru (Japanese: ユル) is a fictional character and the protagonist of the Daemons of the Shadow Realm manga by Hiromu Arakawa. Yuru trains himself to be a hunter for his remote mountain village, while his twin sister Asa lives in captivity due to village tradition. However, one day, the magical barrier protecting the village is suddenly shattered as the Kagemori Clan military force attacks. Ryu Tadera complies and gives Yuru access to the village's twin guardian deities, Left and Right, which Yuru uses to protect his home. Yuru's primary goal is to find his sister after her disappearance and his missing parents, including finding out why his sister's comrades killed adults in his village and taking revenge on them.

Yuru was created by Hiromu Arakawa as a counterpart to the narrative of her previous work Fullmetal Alchemist, as both Yuru and the reader have no knowledge of the series' setting in contrast to the Elric brothers, Edward and Alphonse, who were aware of everywhere they visited. As a result, Yuru is often written as a teenager in shock when exploring the outside world from his village. In the anime TV series adaptation of the manga, Yuru is voiced by Kensho Ono in Japanese and Ben Stegmair in English. Both actors expressed pressure of the initial portrayal of Yuru for often being confused by the world he sees.

Critical response to Yuru's character has been positive for the surprising premise of him being a villager exploring modern society for the first time, which led to comparisons with isekai protagonists and other famous works. He was also well-received for exploring his development as a brother with Asa as well as his two Daemons, with the latter making him come across as an intelligent heroic figure.

== Role in Daemons of the Shadow Realm ==
Set in a world where certain humans can control a duo of supernatural creatures called Daemons, twins Yuru and Asa, "born between day and night" in a premodern Higashi village, are prophesied to wield great power. As a teenager, Yuru learns that he was separated from his sister at a young age, and that the Higashi village has been cut off from the now modern world (called "Lowlands" by the villagers) for centuries, where Asa grew up. Along the way to find each other, the twins learn of their abilities to control all Daemons and eventually discover they must unite to save the world from destruction. One day, the Higashi Village is attacked by a military force, slaughtering many of the people as a young girl with supernatural powers named Gabby leads the charge to capture Yuru. Asa disappears and Yuru is instead confronted by another woman named Asa. Merchant Ryu Tadera takes Yuru to the statues of the village's twin guardian deities, Left and Right. Using a special medallion and Yuru's blood, Dera awakens Left and Right, who are both Daemons. After forming a truce with the enemies, Tera and Hana take Yuru to the outside world.

Yuru learns Tera and Hana were sent by his family to rescue and protect Yuru from hostile or dangerous individuals seeking to exploit him. As someone who has spent his entire life in a village preserving the Edo-period way of life, Yuru acts like a traveler from the past, unprepared for modern life, yet quickly navigating complex situations thanks to his advanced hunting skills. When he reunites with Asa, she explains that, shortly after she joined the Kagemori Clan, she was captured by assassins from the village who killed her by slitting her throat. Despite warnings that people will try to exploit her as a tool, Asa decided to keep living so she could find Yuru. The twins are sought for a Seal, and Yuru asks if he can gain Seal if he were to die. Dera confirms this, but warns that resurrection is not guaranteed, as one of the previous twins who died did not come back.

Determined not to live in hiding, Yuru declares that he will gladly challenge anybody that tries to come after him, whether they be from the village, the Kagemori clan, or anybody else. As Yuru lives with Tera and Hana, he learns that several people from the village were Daemon controlled by villagers, with the Asa imposter being one of them. After making peace with the fake Asa and another Daemon he grew up with, Yuru manages to connect with the real Asa after learning of her dreams to have a normal life once they find their family.

== Creation ==
When writing Daemons of the Shadow Realm, Hiromu Arakawa wanted the narrative approach to be the opposite of her previous work, Fullmetal Alchemist. The motivations of the main characters Edward and Alphonse Elric and other details were well-defined by the end of the first volume. However, in Daemons of the Shadow Realm, the series breaks away from this structure by keeping readers in the dark regarding key details. This essentially puts them in the confusing situation as the main character, Yuru, one that they do not comprehend. Arakawa's intention with the first chapter was to put the reader in the same situation as well, not understanding what is happening or what Daemons are, among other themes. Although both Fullmetal Alchemist and Daemons of the Shadow Realm feature siblings as the leads, there were major differences in systems between both works.

The concept of the Daemon originated from the idea of humans forming contracts with supernatural entities. Despite their otherworldly nature, Arakawa intended for her human characters to develop friendly bonds with the Daemons akin to ordinary human relationships, which became central to Yuru's dynamic with Left and Right. The concept of twins was one Arakawa had contemplated for some time before the manga began, and she wanted their origins to resemble mythological narratives, lending them a striking appeal. She considered various possibilities for their ages during the planning phase. To align with Asa's early antagonistic role, Arakawa chose to give her black hair and dark clothing; conversely, Yuru was assigned opposite colors to create a strong contrast. Some aspects of Yuru's personal development drew on Arakawa's own childhood experiences. She did not aim to present a curse narrative per se, but rather to evoke an unsettling atmosphere through the twins' origins. Because Yuru and Asa had been separated for an extended period of time, Arakawa did not write them as closely bonded siblings. Consequently, she did not regard them as having a conventional brother–sister relationship; instead, she depicted Asa as markedly polite toward Yuru, including the use of Japanese honorifics. Nevertheless, from the outset of the series, Arakawa had already determined that they would eventually develop into genuine equals.

When writing Yuru, manga author Hiromu Arakawa paid attention to his setting of being raised in the mountains and having a lack of knowledge regarding the modern world or the sea. Arakawa wanted to write him with a modern sensibility before realizing it was wrong, citing the scene where Yuru sleeps in a closet after being wounded. However, he would not call it a closet due to the term not existing during the Edo period, which his town was compared to. This led to the author checking on multiple parts and researching history to properly write Yuru, resulting in him becoming a troublesome protagonist to write. Since Yuru's village was based on Takatori Castle in Nara Prefecture, he is rarely drawn with water, something that changes when he is being taken to Terada. Arakawa travelled to Takanori Castle to practise and thus found Yuru's work hard to do in concept.

=== Casting ===
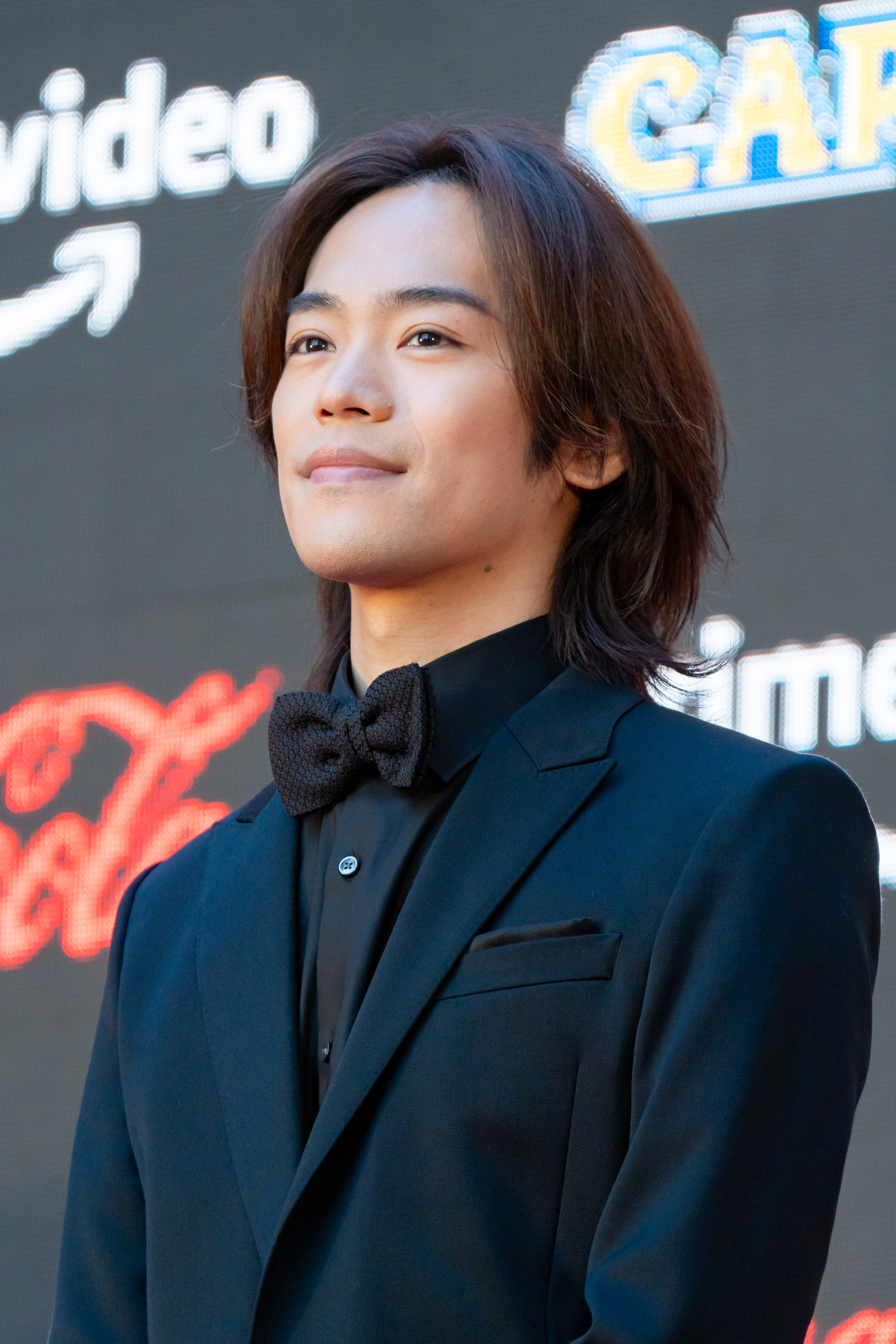
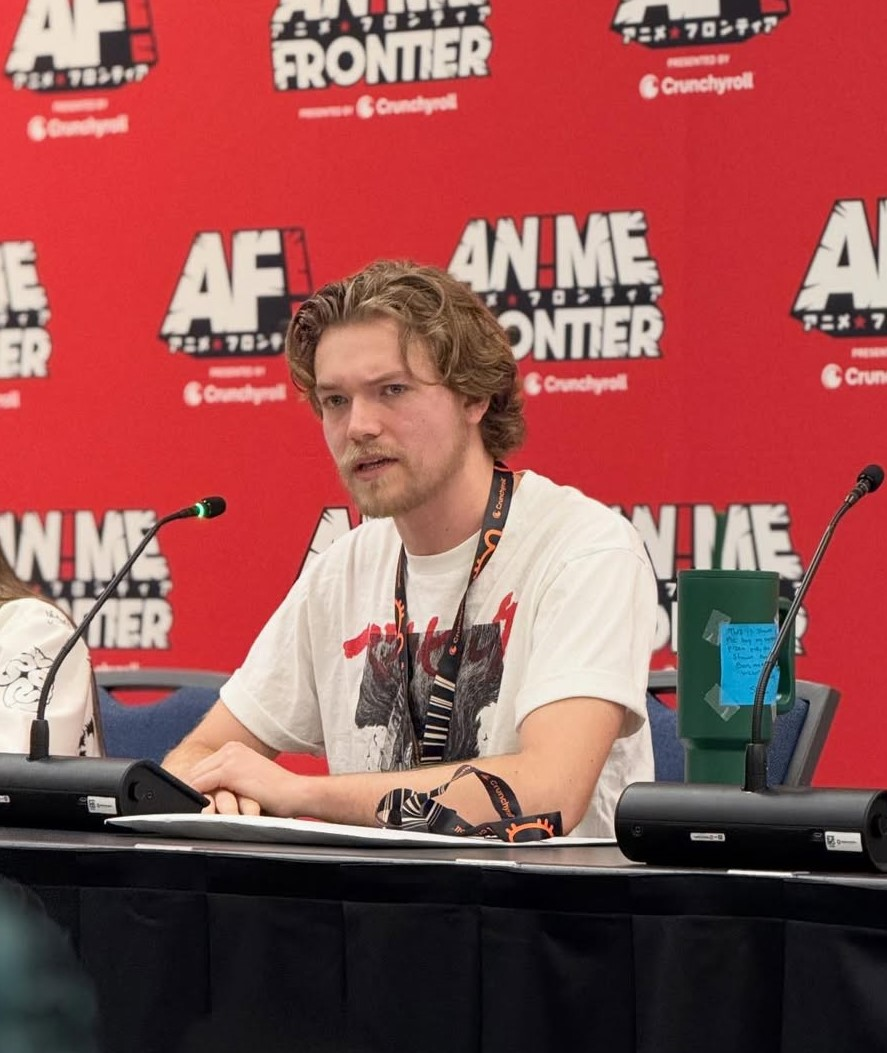
Kensho Ono (left) voices Yuru in Japanese while Ben Segmair voices him in the English dub.

In Japanese, Yuru is voiced by Kensho Ono. When auditioning for the role, Ono had no knowledge of the series, but started reading upon knowing its author had written Fullmetal Alchemist. He noticed that Yuru had a tendency to present himself in comical fashion when seeing the modern world due to his growth in the mountains and enjoyed this part of his characterization. He expressed difficulties with the first two episodes because Yuru was always confused about the current situation in his village. Nevertheless, he was satisfied when recording the series. He also expected viewers would be confused by the story, which made it hard to properly talk about the premise without spoiling future installments. He saw the existence of two Asas as a major conflict with his character, as he cannot accept this situation. According to the actor, this conflict helps to bring a new side to the character, especially since he is a teenager. Kaede Hondo voices Yuru as a child.

In the English dub of the series, Yuru is voiced by Ben Stegmair. He was guided by fellow director Shawn Gann in how to portray the character. He claimed having "three Yurus"; a calm one, an innocent one exploring the world, and a protector who acts like a hunter. Gann supported Stegmair's ideas afterwards. Stegmair had already read the manga in 2021 and grew attached to it thanks to Arakawa's storytelling. Stegmair was supported by his fellow actors when dealing with the parts where Yuru is shocked by the world. Molly Searcy voices a young Yuru.

== Reception ==
=== Critical response ===
Critical response to Yuru's character has been positive, as many writers found his early actions in the narrative surprising. Anime Feminist compared him with the protagonists of Demon Slayer: Kimetsu no Yaiba and The Elusive Samurai, as Yuru finds himself living peacefully until a shocking situation changes his ways of living and has to abandon the village, though the twist is so big the writer refrained herself from giving it to the reader. The writer also enjoyed the design of Yuru fitting Hiromu Arakawa's ideal archetypes. IGN agreed with how Yuru's life changes in a massive violent attack from outside forces that forces him to wield a supernatural power to stand up, comparable to the debut of Attack on Titan. Polygon compared Yuru's character design with Fullmetal Alchemist character Alphonse Elric and Riza Hawkeye while his personality was instead seen as similar to Edward Elric. Nevertheless, they saw Yuru's upbringing as different from other characters created by Hiromu Arakawa, as he was already a hero during his childhood due to his constant work to bring water to his mates. However, the writer claimed the series runs the risk of making Yuru become a bland character due to the complexity Fullmetal Alchemist achieved. With the premiere of the series, Polygon acclaimed the twists of the first episodes involving the truth behind Yuru's life as he is in shock to see advanced technology outside the mountains; this was seen as similar to M. Night Shyamalan's films known for effective twists, leading to comparisons to the isekai genre where a character learns of a new world. However, in Yuru's case, it is reversed since the viewers know of the modern world while the protagonist has no idea what it is. Collider, meanwhile, compared it to the 2003 Fullmetal Alchemist adaptation, involving Edward travelling to the real world, but found Yuru's story more engaging.

Other writers focused on Yuru's relationships. Anime News Network praised the development of his misrelationship with his true sister Asa whom he learns to care for in the 21st episode until learning about her desires and insecurities, which he aims to make reality after separating her from the other Asa he grew up with. Zach Zamora from ScreenRant noticed the series made heavy emphasis on the twins whose names were confused by the Chainsaw Man manga fans for having nearly identical names to two of their protagonists: Yoru and Asa. Zamora said the naming convention Arakawa uses for the two characters contrasts each other as "night and day". The writer also noticed similarities with Demon Slayer: Kimetsu no Yaiba due to the focus on siblings with supernatural powers. Rodrigo Sandoval Lahut from GameRant heavily praised the premise of the importance bertween the two siblings as the two have nearly oppposite backstories despite being twins and having the potential to either protect or destroy the world with the powers they were born with. While both twins show unique talents in the series' beginning, by the time of writing the article Lahut said that there was still not major progress in the manga series to explain well what is the power the two protagonists can develop.

Carlyle Edmundson of Screen Rant compared the protagonist to Edward Elric as being more reckless, as he does not see himself as worthy of using Right and Left and instead fights alone when first meeting them. While Yuru is able to command the Tsugai, the writer praised the series for making him come across as a very heroic character in so little time despite the mystery, comparing the Tsugai present in the manga to that of Stands seen in Hirohiko Araki's JoJo's Bizarre Adventure series. Fandomwire enjoyed Yuru's writing in the 10th episode for making him an intelligent fighter who relies on strategies rather than just brute strength to defeat the enemy while also showing a strong bond with his two Tsugai, leading to a well-earned victory against the antagonist.

=== Popularity ===
In July 2026, Kensho Ono was appointed as Tokyo Metropolitan Police Department's "One-Day Traffic Safety Ambassador". He appeared at the appointment ceremony held at the Tokyo Metropolitan Police Department wearing a police officer's uniform. For this collaboration, a poster was created featuring Yuru and Daemons, both dressed as police officers, checking left and right before crossing a crosswalk in front of the Tokyo Metropolitan Police Department, in honor of Yuru's mate. The poster was displayed in police stations, elementary schools, and other public facilities throughout Tokyo from late July onwards.

At the 16th Newtype Anime Awards in 2026, Yuru came in second place for male character award, behind Satoru Gojo from Jujutsu Kaisen.
