= List of Daemons of the Shadow Realm characters =

Character shots of the various humans (top) and Daemons (bottom) from the first opening sequence of the anime adaptation

The Japanese manga series Daemons of the Shadow Realm features an extensive cast of characters created by Hiromu Arakawa.

== Creation and conception ==
The concept of the Daemon originated from the idea of humans forming contracts with supernatural entities. Despite their otherworldly nature, manga author Hiromu Arakawa intended for her human characters to develop friendly bonds with the daemons akin to ordinary human relationships, a dynamic that became central to Yuru's interactions with Left and Right. Arakawa stated that the characters Right and Left, who assist Yuru, were originally conceived around the time of her debut as a manga author, though at that stage they existed only in prototype form and lacked fully developed personalities.

The twin motif was one Arakawa had contemplated for some time prior to the manga's serialization, and she sought to endow their origins with a mythological quality to enhance their visual and narrative impact. During the planning phase, she explored various possibilities for their ages. To complement Asa's early antagonistic role, Arakawa chose to give her black hair and dark clothing; conversely, Yuru was assigned opposing colors to establish a strong visual contrast. Certain aspects of Yuru's character development were informed by Arakawa's own childhood experiences. She did not intend to present a curse narrative per se, but rather to evoke an unsettling atmosphere through the twins' backstory. Given that Yuru and Asa had been separated for an extended period, Arakawa did not portray them as closely bonded siblings. Consequently, she did not regard their relationship as a conventional brother–sister dynamic; instead, she depicted Asa as markedly polite toward Yuru, including the use of Japanese honorifics. Nevertheless, from the outset of the series, Arakawa had already determined that they would ultimately develop into genuine equals.

== Main characters ==
=== Yuru ===
Voiced by: Kensho Ono, Kaede Hondo (young) (Japanese); Ben Stegmair, Molly Searcy (young) (English)

Yuru (ユル) is Asa's older twin brother. He is a blond-haired boy who embodies the Night and commands the Left and Right Daemons, which resemble powerful female and male oni warriors, respectively. Rescued from the village by Dera and Hana during the massacre, his primary goal is to find his younger sister and parents, and uncover the cause of the conflict unfolding around them. Including finding out why his sister's comrades killed adults in his village and taking revenge on them. As someone who has spent his entire life in a village preserving the Edo-period way of life, Yuru acts like a traveler from the past, unprepared for modern life, yet quickly navigating complex situations thanks to his advanced hunting skills.

=== Asa ===
Voiced by: Yume Miyamoto (Japanese); Molly Zhang (English)

Asa (アサ) is Yuru's younger twin sister. She is a tall, masculine girl who embodies the Day and whose Daemon is currently unknown. Although she displays a very tough character and a readiness for violence in critical situations, she is also a reliable friend to Jin and Gabby, and has a pronounced brother complex towards Yuru due to their long separation. She actually left the village at a young age with her parents, and a "False Asa" (later revealed to be Kiri) with a more idealized personality and the ability to regenerate lived in the settlement in her place.

== Danno Household ==
=== Ryu Tadera / Dera ===
Voiced by: Yuichi Nakamura (Japanese); Jarrod Greene (English)

Ryu Tadera (田寺 リュウ, Tadera Ryū), known as Dera (デラ), is a middle-aged man with slightly gray hair, initially portrayed as a traveling merchant, who serves as a link between the villagers and the outside world. In reality, he is a member of a long line of skilled warriors, capable of defeating a group of soldiers unarmed, and sent by his family to rescue and protect Yuru from hostile or dangerous individuals seeking to exploit him. He works in tandem with Hana, and occasionally flirts with her, half-jokingly convincing her to marry him as part of the cover story of his new young wife and stepmother to Yuru.

=== Hana Danno ===
Voiced by: Miyuri Shimabukuro (Japanese); Meggie-Elise (English)

Hana Danno (段野 ハナ, Danno Hana) is a young woman who helps Dera protect Yuri and wields two Daemons named Kodetsu and Jiro. Although she sincerely helps protect the boy, she reluctantly accepts the cover story of being Dera's young, new wife, even though she actually dreams of Jason Statham as her ideal man.

=== Azami ===
Voiced by: Yukari Anzai (Japanese); Caitlin Martelle (English)

Azami (アザミ) is a shy little girl from Higashi Village and one of the few survivors of Gabby's attack on the village. She later resides on the Danno household after being kidnapped out of the village as a hostage along with Kiri, fearing of what consequences the village would do to her for secrecy.

=== Ken Tadera ===
Voiced by: Natsumi Fujiwara (Japanese); Cassie Ewulu (English)

Ken Tadera (田寺 ケン, Tadera Ken) is Ryu's Ethiopian 13-year-old half-brother. He is sensitive, shy and inexperienced with Daemons. His Daemons were the pair Tenaga-Ashinaga.

=== Roei Tadera ===
Voiced by: Takehito Koyasu (Japanese); Jason Marnocha (English)

Roei Tadera (田寺 ロウエイ, Tadera Rouei) is Ryu and Ken's father and the previous head of Tadera Family, known for his great strength and skills as protector of the village. Despite his reputation, he is also an otaku fan, especially of Hikaru's work. He regularly uses a scarf and glasses to mask his face after being disfigured by an unknown assailant from the ruins of Nishino Village.

== Kagemori Clan ==
=== Jin Kagemori ===
Voiced by: Junichi Suwabe (Japanese); Jerry Jewell (English)

Jin Kagemori (影森 ジン, Kagemori Jin) is a reliable senior member of the Kagemori family, whose Daemons are Ai and Makoto. He is the youngest child of the family.

=== Gabby ===
Voiced by: Misaki Kuno (Japanese); Mikaela Krantz (English)

Gabby (ガブ, Gabu) is a blonde teenage girl with a Daemon shaped like a floating pair of teeth with eyes named Gabriel. Although she is initially introduced as a cynical and cruel killer who kills anyone regardless of gender or threat, she is also shown as convincingly not harming children, and acting like a normal teenager when interacting with her friends.

=== Gonzo Kagemori ===
Voiced by: Hiroshi Iwasaki (Japanese); Kent Williams (English)

Gonzo Kagemori (影森 ゴンゾウ, Kagemori Gonzō) is the head of the Kagemori clan, whose kind appearance hides his authoritarian and self-serving nature. However, he actually cares about his clan and the people who work with the clan. He has several Daemons, the pair called The Monster Parade (百鬼夜行, Hyakkiyakō), the Centimanus and the Uyamuya.

=== Asuma Kagemori ===
Voiced by: Akira Ishida (Japanese); Austin Tindle (English)

Asuma Kagemori (影森 アスマ, Kagemori Asuma) is Jin's older half-brother, whose Daemons are Yozakura and Asagiri. Asuma is an ominous person who usually gives the wrong impression since he acts suspiciously and attracts a lot of attention.

=== Hikaru Kagemori ===
Voiced by: Kappei Yamaguchi (Japanese); Aaron Campbell (English)

Hikaru Kagemori (影森 ヒカル, Kagemori Hikaru) is Gonzo's kind and overweight oldest son and heir of the clan, who spends most of his time as a manga artist under the pen name Hikaru Hagure (波久礼 ヒカル, Hagure Hikaru). His main Daemons are Black and White (黒白, Kokubyaku), as well as the Centimanus and the Uyamuya. He later becomes the head of the Kagemori clan after Gonzo's death at the hands of Misasagi.

=== Hayato Shingo ===
Voiced by: Setsuji Satō (Japanese); Eric Vale (English)

Hayato Shingo (新郷 ハヤト, Shingō Hayato) is Asuma's maternal uncle. He is highly intellectual and self-centered, believing himself to be superior to others. He commands the Daemons Fujin (風神, Fūjin) and Raijin (雷神), also known as Fujin-Raijin (風神雷神, Fūjin-Raijin), a pair of white and black bipedal Daemons, who control wind and lightning, respectively.

=== Iori Shingo ===
Voiced by: Atsuko Yuya (Japanese); Emily Neves (English)

Iori Shingo (新郷 イオリ, Shingō Iori) is a member of the Shingo family until she met Gonzo who invited her to be part of his family and they eventually had a son, Asuma. She was the previous master of Yozakura and Asagiri.

=== Haruo Kuroya ===
Voiced by: Kazuki Ura (Japanese); Brandon Loera (English)

Haruo Kuroya (黒谷 ハルオ, Kuroya Haruo) is the youngest of the Kuroya foster siblings. He is kind, but fiercely loyal. His Daemons are Torty and Bunbun.

=== Natsuki Kuroya ===
Voiced by: Yū Shimamura (Japanese); Kelsey Cruz (English)

Natsuki Kuroya (黒谷 ナツキ, Kuroya Natsuki) is the oldest of the Kuroya bodyguards. She is very diligent and serious about her job, but loving to her family. Her Daemons are the traditional Japanese demon-looking Jijimaru and Babamaru, who form the pair Namomihagi.

=== Fuyuki Kuroya ===
Voiced by: Hayato Fujii (Japanese); Peyton Howard (English)

Fuyuki Kuroya (黒谷 フユキ, Kuroya Fuyuki) is the second child of the Kuroya family, a calm and quiet person. His Daemons are Whisper and Embrace, who form the pair Blacklist.

=== Sakurazawa ===
Voiced by: Yumi Uchiyama (Japanese); Rowan Gilvie (English)

Sakurazawa (桜沢) is the head doctor for the Kagemori clan, who dislikes treating wounded, despite her uncompromising professionalism.

=== Makoto Tachikawa ===
Voiced by: Reina Kondō (Japanese); Ali Macaulay (English)

Makoto Tachikawa (立川 マコト, Tachikawa Makoto) is one of the mercenary Daemon wielders, who was hired to attack the Kagemori estate to retrieve the twins. Following their defeat, Gonzo recruits her to the family and offers to pay for her sick mother's treatment. Her Daemons are the pair Transforming Foxes (狐狸変化, Korihenge), composed of Akai, a yellow fox spirit that can extend its tail and turn it into a net; and Midori, a brown raccoon spirit that can shapeshift into anyone.

=== Keiichi Hamura ===
Voiced by: Hayata Okawa (Japanese); Brad Foster (English)

Keiichi Hamura (羽村 圭一, Hamura Keiichi) is a negligent Daemone wielder and mercenary, who took the job to attack the Kagemori estate in order to square off his debt. Following his defeat, Asa uses Break to liberate his Daemons and he is recruited as a foot soldier.

== Higashi Village ==
=== Yamaha Ono ===
Voiced by: Mizuka Arima (Japanese); Wendy Powell (English)

Yamaha Ono (小野 ヤマハ, Ono Yamaha) is the elder leader of Higashi Village. While she cares about her village, she is opportunistic and desires to use Yuru and Asa.

=== Kyoka ===
Voiced by: Arisa Sakuraba (Japanese); Brianna Roberts (English)

Kyoka (キョウカ) is a Higashi Village retainer, Nagisa's childhood friend supporting Yamaha. Unlike other residents who wish to exploit the twins' powers, she sympathizes with them and wants them to live normal lives. Her Daemons are the pair called Zashiki-Warashi.

=== Mine ===
Voiced by: Yūya Uchida (Japanese); Seth Magill (English)

Mine (ミネ) is a Higashi Village resident and the father of Yuru and Asa. He is a kind man and a great hunter.

=== Nagisa Kinjo ===
Voiced by: Saori Ōnishi (Japanese); Jordan Chantha Weir (English)

Nagisa Kinjo (金城 ナギサ, Kinjō Nagisa) is an outsider from Okinawa Island who accidentally discovered Higashi Village, where she fell in love with Mine and gave birth to Yuru and Asa.

=== Yama ===
Voiced by: Hidenobu Kiuchi (Japanese); Jim Foronda (English)

Yama (ヤマ) is a radical shaman connected to the Higashi village network on the Lowlands, and Dera's supplier. His Daemons are Lady (レディー, Redī) and Gentleman (ジェントルマン, Jentoruman).

== Nishino Village ==
=== Misasagi ===
Voiced by: Takaya Kuroda (Japanese); Christopher Wehkamp (English)

Misasagi (御陵) is the owner of a Chinese restaurant called West Wind and a resident of Nishino Village, who seeks to obtain Yuru and Asa's power. He is a carefree, but calculating man with several red tattoos on his body. His Daemons are the formless Heaven and Earth (天と地, Ten to Chi). Heaven manifests as a star, that can make things rise or its targets receive an upward blow. Earth manifests in shadows on the ground and can make a target touch the ground or strike them downwards.

=== Hidekatsu Daigo ===
Voiced by: Tarō Kiuchi (Japanese); Tyson Rinehart (English)

Hidekatsu Daigo (醍醐 ヒデカツ, Daigo Hidekatsu) is a broad, burly and bearded resident of Nishino Village, who prides himself in his great physical strength. His Daemons are the pair Sadomasochist (サドマゾ, Sadomazo), composed of Masochist and Sadist. Masochist is a deformed mass with eyes and a mouth, but only says things to get hit more (due to its masochistic nature). Sadist is a small humanoid figure, with greater fluency, even capable of saying hurtful things.

=== Nagitsuji ===
Voiced by: Takeo Ōtsuka (Japanese); Nicolas Roye (English)

Nagitsuji (椥辻) is an apathetic resident of Nishino Village, who has a childlike appearance. His parasitic Daemons are the pair Judgment Day (裁きの日, Jajjimento Dei), composed of Sodom and Gomorrah. Sodom is placed in the user's heart, while Gomorra is placed in the user's hand, allowing one to listen through the parasites deposited by them.

=== Minase Ono ===
Voiced by: Yoko Soumi (Japanese); Anastasia Muñoz (English)

Minase Ono (小野 ミナセ, Ono Minase) is a manipulative former priestess from Nishino Village and Yamaha's older twin, as well as Akio's biological mother. She possesses part of the "Seal" ability, which she used to prevent herself, her sister, and Akio from aging and to block Akio's pain senses. She has a Daemon that takes the form of a one-eyed bird.

=== Ivan Yosano ===
Voiced by: Shin-ichiro Miki (Japanese); Alejandro Saab (English)

Ivan Yosano (与謝野 イワン, Yosano Ivan) is a bloodthirsty assassin affiliated with Nishino Village and the alleged murderer of Mine and Nagisa. He proficiently uses his Daemons in battle, the pair called Magatsuhi, composed of Daikyo and Shokyo.

=== Akio Kuroya ===
Voiced by: Ryunosuke Watanuki (Japanese); Zac Loera (English)

Akio Kuroya (黒谷 アキオ, Kuroya Akio) is an expressionless member of the Kuroya family, who serve as bodyguards to the Kagemori clan. However, he is actually a spy from Nishino Village, tasked with killing Yuru and Asa once they are reunited. Akio was born unable to feel pain, though it is implied that his mother sealed his ability to feel pain. His Daemons are the giants Yamakaze and Tanikaze, who compose the pair Mountain God (ヤマノカミ, Yama no Kami).

=== Anna Mineyama ===
Voiced by: Sumire Uesaka (Japanese); Skye Redden (English)

Anna Mineyama (峰山 アンナ, Mineyama Anna) is a seemingly normal high-school girl working for Ivan as a cleaner, but she is actually a jealous woman with a crush on him. Her Daemons are the pair Soul Roller (魂タマコロガシ, Tama Korogashi), composed of the beetle-shaped Taro and Hime. Taro has the ability to roll corpses into meat-balls, while Hime has the ability to lay eggs in the balls that Taro creates.

== Daemons ==
=== Left ===
Voiced by: Takako Honda (Japanese); Colleen Clinkenbeard (English)

Left (左, Hidari) is formerly the left statue in the settlement. She now takes the form of a muscular, tall woman reminiscent of an oni. Like Right, she values strength and communicates in an old-fashioned manner, but in contrast, she has a more phlegmatic personality.

=== Right ===
Voiced by: Rikiya Koyama (Japanese); Bill Butts (English)

Right (右, Migi) is formerly the right statue in the settlement. He now takes the form of a large, very muscular man reminiscent of an oni. He possesses the mentality of an old-fashioned, communicative warrior who relishes battle, but is completely devoted to his master's commands.

=== Gabriel ===
Voiced by: Ayumu Murase (Japanese); Nic Hamill and Amanda Gael (English)

Gabriel (ガブリエル, Gaburieru) is the Daemon pair serving Gabby, which take the appearance of one circular flying upper and lower jaws with eyes, respectively. They can expand and bite off chunks of flesh from enemies, or shield their owner.

=== Zashiki-Warashi ===
Voiced by: Yume Miyamoto (Japanese); Molly Zhang (English) (Kiri)
Voiced by: Ryōta Ōsaka (Japanese); Abi Kumar (English) (Danji)
Voiced by: Momoka Terasawa, Yuzu Yumoto (Japanese); Monica Flatley, Bryn Apprill (English) (Zashiki-Warashi)

Kiri (キリ) and Danji (ダンジ), are Kyoka's Daemons who form the pair Zashiki-Warashi (ザシキワラシ, Zashikiwarashi),. They both use shadows of their surroundings, being able to change appearance thanks to this as well as being able to manipulate it to attack others.

=== Kodetsu and Jiro ===
Voiced by: Ayumu Murase (Japanese); Ciarán Strange (English)

Kodetsu (虎鉄) and Jiro (虎鉄) are two Daemons serving Hana, with Kodetsu serving the form of a striped orange cat and Jiro of a pure white dog. Kodetsu is very tech-savvy due to them living among humans for a long time and Jiro has exceptional tracking skills.

=== Scavenger ===
Voiced by: Ayumu Murase (Japanese); Abigail Blythe (English)

Ai (愛) and Makoto (誠) are Jin's Daemons who form the pair Scavenger (掃除屋(スカベンジャー), Sukabenjā). Ai has the ability to slip through walls and swallow anything she is asked to, so she is often used for cleaning. Makoto can reproduce an unlimited number of objects of any kind that Ai swallows beforehand.

=== Oshira ===
Voiced by: Saori Hayami (Japanese); Mia Azuaje (English)

Oshira (オシラ) are an ancient pair of Daemons and old acquaintances of Left and Right, considered to be gods. The pair consists of an entirely light-blue young woman riding a scarred horse of the same color.

=== Tortoise and Hare ===
Voiced by: Kamiri Matsuda (Japanese); Tia Ballard (English) (Bunbun)

Torty (夜桜) and Bunbun (朝霧) are Haruo's Daemons who form the pair Tortoise (亀, Kame) and Hare (兎, Usagi). Torty appears to be a common tortoise, with two red flames on his back. He can crush targets beneath him with his weight, which can be adjusted by his owner. Bunbun is a white mischievous bipedal hare, wearing a red vest and an orange collar. He can run at great speed, making it impossible for slow enemies to catch him.

=== Yin and Yang ===
Voiced by: Ayumu Murase (Japanese); Ryan Seale (English) (Daifuku)
Voiced by: Ayumu Murase (Japanese); Leo Matthews (English) (Ohagi)

Daifuku (だいふく) and Ohagi (おはぎ) are the Daemons who form the white and black pair called Yin and Yang (陰陽, Inyō). By combining together, Daifuku and Ohagi can create a giant beast whose body contains a seemingly infinite storage space, which can be used to trap or transport beings and objects safely. Initially, they are contracted to a member of the group attacking the Kagemori clan, before Asa recruits them as her own.

=== Tenaga-Ashinaga ===
Voiced by: Ako Mayama (Japanese); Emily Fajardo (English) (Long Arms)
Voiced by: Shigeru Chiba (Japanese); Marcus Stimac (English) (Long Legs)

Long Arms (手長, Tenaga) and Long Legs (足長, Ashinaga) are Ken's Daemons, called the pair Tenaga-Ashinaga (手長足長), with their respective appendages being especially long.

=== Magatsuhi ===
Voiced by: Misato Fukuen (Japanese); Lily Gast (English) (Daikyo)
Voiced by: Hiroyuki Yoshino (Japanese); Brandon Acosta (English) (Shokyo)

Daikyo (大凶, Daikyō) and Shokyo (小凶, Shōkyō) compose the Daemon pair called Magatsuhi (マガツヒ, Magatsuhi), Ivan's Daemons. Shokyo is a short sword-shaped Daemon, that can cut out a space and change it, allowing its user to teleport depending on its use. He is an intense and hostile Daemon, even hurting his owner sometimes. Daikyo is a long sword-shaped Daemon, that has the ability to steal vital energy from any being and transfer it to another. She is a quiet and grim Daemon.

=== Kin'ugyokuto ===
Voiced by: Ayumu Murase (Japanese); Katie Welch (English) (Asagiri)
Voiced by: Ayumu Murase (Japanese); Ethan Gallardo (English) (Yozakura)

Yozakura (夜桜) and Asagiri (朝霧) are Asuma's Daemons, the pair called Kin'ugyokuto (金烏玉兎). A fire-breathing skull with horns and a cluster of moths form Yozakura's appearance. He can only be in dark environments or at night. Asagiri is composed of a cluster of butterflies, which take the appearance of a completely white woman with wings. She is the other half of Yozakura which can only be in bright or daytime environments.

=== Nanomihagi ===
Voiced by: Ayumu Murase (Jijimaru and Babamaru) (Japanese); T.J. Anthony (Jijimaru and Babamaru) (English)

Jijimaru (ジジ丸) and Babamaru (ババ丸), who form the pair Namomihagi (なもみはぎ), Natsuki's Daemons. Similar in appearance, they are a pair of tall samurai-like humanoid Daemons with oni masks and katanas, who loyally guard their master.

=== Blacklist ===
Voiced by: Ayumu Murase (Whisper and Embrace) (Japanese); Katelyn Barr (Whisper and Embrace) (English)

Whisper (ウィスパー, Wisupā) and Embrace (エンブレイス, Enbureisu), who form the pair Blacklist (閻魔帳, Burakku Risuto), Fuyuki's Daemons. Whisper is a manuscript-shaped Daemon, that can obtain all the information about a person through their Daemon once they are held by Embrace, a pair of large three-fingered hands with eyes in their palms.

=== The Aliens ===
Voiced by: Yūji Ueda (Japanese); David Matranga (English) (male)
Voiced by: Fumie Mizusawa (Japanese); Morgan Lauré Garrett (English) (female)

The Aliens (宇宙人, Uchūjin) are a pair of humble and friendly Daemons, who accidentally got contracted to a dog when it injured itself. They both have the appearance of humanoid grey aliens, and they usually disguise themselves as humans walking their pet.

=== Break ===
Voiced by: Yoshiko Sakakibara (Japanese); Mallorie Rodak (English)

Break (解, Kai) is one half of the Daemon pair residing in Yomotsu Hirasaka, the border realm between the living and the dead. This realm is accessible only by the twins after they have died once. Break has a vaguely humanoid appearance, clad in white drapes. Break allows its master to break anything, physical or conceptual, that they point to.

=== Yamashina ===
Voiced by: Kazuyuki Okitsu (Japanese); Derick Snow (English)

Yamashina (山科) is a mysterious Daemon affiliated with Nishino Village, whose small body is wrapped in bandages, revealing only his eyes and part of his face. He is intelligent enough to speak, but usually only repeats others' speech.
