= Yume Miyamoto =

Japanese actress (born 1997)

- 宮本 侑芽
- Born: January 22, 1997 (age 29); Fukuoka Prefecture, Japan
- Occupations: Actress; voice actress; tarento
- Years active: 2000–present
- Agent: Himawari Theatre Group
- Height: 152 cm (5 ft 0 in)

Yume Miyamoto (宮本侑芽, Miyamoto Yume; born January 22, 1997) is a Japanese actress, voice actress, and tarento. She is affiliated with Himawari Theatre Group. Debuting as an actress during her early childhood, she would then begin acting in television dramas, live-action films, and dubs of foreign movies. As a voice actress, she is known for her roles as Megumi Amatsuka in GJ Club, Mahiru Kasumi in Aikatsu Stars!, Rumia Tingel in Akashic Records of Bastard Magic Instructor, Rikka Takarada in SSSS.Gridman, and Magine / Zenkai Magine in Kikai Sentai Zenkaiger.

== Biography ==
Miyamoto was born in Fukuoka on January 22, 1997. She joined the Himawari Theatre Group at the age of four, and moved to Tokyo at the age of six. She debuted as an actress in the television program Hamidashikeiji Jounetsukei, and she would then appear in the series Ai no Ie: Nakimushi Sato to 7-Ri no Ko at the age of six. She continued acting in television dramas and films, such as appearing in an episode of the Japanese television drama Socrates in Love.

In 2013, Miyamoto played her first main role in an anime series as Megumi Amatsuka in GJ Club. Miyamoto and Maaya Uchida performed the series' first ending theme "I Wish (Tokimeki no Mahou) (I wish ~ときめきの魔法~), while Miyamoto, Uchida, Suzuko Mimori, and Chika Arakawa performed the series' fourth ending theme "Hashiridasou!" (走りだそう！).

In 2016, Miyamoto played the role of Mahiru Kasumi in the multimedia franchise Aikatsu Stars!. In 2017, she played the role of Rumia Tingel in the anime series Akashic Records of Bastard Magic Instructor. Miyamoto, Akane Fujita, and Ari Ozawa performed the series' ending theme "Precious You". In 2018, she played the roles of Yuri Kazami in Miss Caretaker of Sunohara-sou and Rikka Takarada in SSSS.Gridman.

In 2021, she played the lead female role of Magine in the Japanese superhero drama Kikai Sentai Zenkaiger.

== Filmography ==
=== Television ===
- Hamidashikeiji Jounetsukei

2003

- Ai no Ie: Nakimushi Sato to 7-Ri no Ko

2004

- Socrates in Love

2010

- Ryōmaden as Kimie

2021

- Kikai Sentai Zenkaiger as Magine / Zenkai Magine

=== Film ===
2008

- Gu-Gu Datte Neko de Aru

2021

- Kikai Sentai Zenkaiger THE MOVIE: Red Battle! All Sentai Rally!! as Magine / Zenkai Magine
- Saber + Zenkaiger: Super Hero Senki as Magine / Zenkai Magine

2022

- Kamen Rider Saber Spin-Off: Kamen Rider Sabela & Durendal as servant lady

=== V-Cinema ===
2022

- Kikai Sentai Zenkaiger VS Kiramager VS Senpaiger

2023

- Avataro Sentai Donbrothers VS Zenkaiger

=== Anime series ===
2005

- Capeta as Monami Suzuki
- Sugar Sugar Rune as Sophia Takigawa (ep 20)
- Mushishi as Ito (young; ep 17); Mayu (ep 4); Mushi (ep 1)

2006

- Ghost Hunt as Ayami Morishita

2008

- Rental Magica as Dragon Girl (eps 22–24)

2011

- Infinite Stratos as Girl (ep 12)

2012

- Kids on the Slope as Girl (ep 9); Sachiko (7 episodes)

2013

- GJ Club as Megumi Amatsuka

2016

- Aikatsu Stars! as Mahiru Kasumi

2017

- Akashic Records of Bastard Magic Instructor as Rumia Tingel

2018

- Miss Caretaker of Sunohara-sou as Yuri Kazami
- SSSS.Gridman as Rikka Takarada

2019

- Bermuda Triangle: Colorful Pastrale as Adele
- Dororo as Okowa (ep 19)

2020

- ID: Invaded as Kaeru/Kiki Asukai
- Seton Academy: Join the Pack! as Hitomi Hino
- Sing "Yesterday" for Me as Haru Nonoka
- Tamayomi as Rei Okada
- The Misfit of Demon King Academy as Xia Minsheng

2021

- Godzilla Singular Point as Mei Kamino
- Those Snow White Notes as Shuri Maeda
- Blue Period as Maki Kuwana
- Taisho Otome Fairy Tale as Tamako Shima

2022

- Teasing Master Takagi-san 3 as Chi Nishikata
- Tomodachi Game as Shiho Sawaragi
- Black Summoner as Rion
- Mobile Suit Gundam: The Witch from Mercury as Nika Nanaura (episodes 1–9, 13-)

2023

- The Fire Hunter as Hotaru
- Too Cute Crisis as Rasta Cole
- Why Raeliana Ended Up at the Duke's Mansion as Raeliana McMillan/Rinko Hanasaki
- The Gene of AI as Risa Higuchi

2024

- Chained Soldier as Himari Azuma
- Brave Bang Bravern! as Hibiki Rio
- Metallic Rouge as Rouge Redstar
- Snack Basue as Kosame
- Shoshimin: How to Become Ordinary as Tokiko Nakamaru

2025

- I Have a Crush at Work as Yui Mitsuya
- I'm a Noble on the Brink of Ruin, So I Might as Well Try Mastering Magic as Reina
- Anne Shirley as Diana Barry
- Ruri Rocks as Yōko Imari
- With You and the Rain as Arata
- Sword of the Demon Hunter: Kijin Gentōshō as Jishibari

2026

- Shiboyugi: Playing Death Games to Put Food on the Table as Airi
- Daemons of the Shadow Realm as Asa
- Heroine? Saint? No, I'm an All-Works Maid (and Proud of It)! as Melody Wave

2027

- Red Riding Hood: A Detective Story as Little Red Riding Hood
- Rainy Day Serenade as Hina Katagiri

=== Original video animation ===
2019

- Fragtime as Haruka Murakami

=== Anime films ===
2007

- Summer Days with Coo as Kindergarten Classmate

2020

- Josee, the Tiger and the Fish as Mai Ninomiya

2022

- Teasing Master Takagi-san: The Movie as Chi Nishikata

2023

- Gridman Universe as Rikka Takarada

2026

- Shiboyugi: Playing Death Games to Put Food on the Table – 44: Cloudy Beach as Airi
- Made in Abyss: Mezameru Shinpi as Menae

=== Video games ===
2018

- Kantai Collection as Minegumo, Nisshin, Abyssal Sun Princess

2017

- Kingdom Hearts HD 2.8 Final Chapter Prologue as Ava

2021

- The Caligula Effect 2 as Kiriko Miyasako
- Phantasy Star Online 2: New Genesis as Manon
- Azur Lane as Rikka Takarada

2022

- Stranger of Paradise: Final Fantasy Origin as Princess Sarah

2023

- 404 Game Re:set as Golden Axe

2025

- Zenless Zone Zero as Orphie Magnusson and Magus

2026

- Arknights: Endfield as Xaihi
- Nekopara: Sekai Connect as Fengli (Hōri)
- Petit Planet as Trixie

=== Dubbing roles ===
==== Live-action ====
- All of Us Are Dead as Nam On-jo
- Almost Never as Chloe
- Cinderella Man as Rosemarie "Rosy" Braddock
- Flightplan as Julia Pratt
- Heretic as Sister Paxton
- I Am Mother as Daughter
- Jewel in the Palace as Min So-Won

==== Animation ====
- Bambi II as Faline
- Frankenweenie as Weird Girl
- Lilo & Stitch: The Series as Lilo
