= Abu Yuru =

Abu Yuru ابويرو
- Village
- Location within Iran
- Coordinates: 30°58′02″N 49°08′53″E
- Country: Iran
- Province: Khuzestan
- County: Ahvaz
- Bakhsh: Central
- Rural District: Gheyzaniyeh

Population (2006)
  - Total: 200
- Time zone: UTC+3:30 (IRST)
  - Summer (DST): UTC+4:30 (IRDT)

Abu Yuru (Persian: ابويرو, also Romanized as Abū Yūrū and Abū Yowrū) is a village in Gheyzaniyeh Rural District, in the Central District of Ahvaz County, Khuzestan Province, Iran. At the 2006 census, its population was 200, in 23 families.
