= Daemons of the Shadow Realm =

Japanese manga series by Hiromu Arakawa

- First tankōbon volume cover, featuring Yuru (center) and Daemons Left and Right in their statue form

黄泉のツガイ (Yomi no Tsugai)
- Genre: Adventure; Dark fantasy; Supernatural
- Manga
- Written by: Hiromu Arakawa
- Published by: Square Enix
- English publisher: NA: Square Enix Manga & Books
- Imprint: Gangan Comics
- Magazine: Monthly Shōnen Gangan
- Original run: December 10, 2021 – present
- Volumes: 14
- Anime television series
- Daemons of the Shadow Realm (2026)
- icon

Daemons of the Shadow Realm (Japanese: 黄泉のツガイ, Hepburn: Yomi no Tsugai; lit. 'Pairs from the Underworld') is a Japanese manga series written and illustrated by Hiromu Arakawa. It has been serialized in Square Enix's shōnen manga anthology magazine Monthly Shōnen Gangan since December 2021, with its chapters collected in 14 tankōbon volumes as of November 2026. The series follows Yuru, a young hunter whose ancient village is attacked by the forces of modern organized crime, the Kagemori family. One of the attackers is identical to Yuru's sister, Asa. After awakening two Daemons, supernatural beings known as Left and Right, Yuru explores the outside world to uncover the truth about the two Asas and the secret of their births. Arakawa started writing the series after researching occultism and yōkai, which she wanted to focus on in the form of demon allies. An anime television series adaptation produced by Bones Film aired its first season from April to September 2026. A second season has been announced.

The manga has been well-received and had over 8.5 million copies in circulation by November 2026. Critical reception has been mostly positive due to the plot twists involving the premise, which changed readers' impressions of the cast and setting.

== Synopsis ==
Set in a world where certain humans can control a duo of supernatural creatures called Daemons, twins Yuru and Asa, "born between day and night" in a premodern Higashi village, are prophesied to wield great power. As a teenager, Yuru learns that he was separated from his sister at a young age, and that the Higashi village has been cut off from the now modern world (called "Lowlands" by the villagers) for centuries, where Asa grew up. Along the way to find each other, the twins learn of their abilities to control all Daemons and eventually discover they must unite to save the world from destruction.

== Production ==
Before creating the series, manga author Hiromu Arakawa told her editors at Monthly Shōnen Gangan that she wanted to create something outside of the fantasy genre. Discussions regarding the new series commenced during the COVID-19 pandemic, prompting Arakawa to undertake research for her subsequent project. Arakawa had long been interested in occultism and yōkai, which formed the conceptual basis of the new work. Although she also considered fantasy elements, she ultimately chose to focus more heavily on the occult. In preparation for writing Daemons of the Shadow Realm, Arakawa had already produced multiple storyboards intended for the first volume. She consulted numerous books during the writing process, some of which were works she had admired since childhood; her editor cited Tono Monogatari as an example. The manga was officially announced in the August 2021 issue of Square Enix's shōnen manga anthology magazine Monthly Shōnen Gangan (released on July 12), in celebration of the 20th anniversary of Arakawa's first series, Fullmetal Alchemist (2001–2010).

Arakawa stated that the characters Right and Left, who assist Yuru, were originally conceived sometime around when Fullmetal Alchemist began serialization, though they were in prototype form at that time and did not have fully developed personalities. Arakawa found herself fascinated by their character designs even before their personalities were finalized. The concept of the Daemon originated from the idea of humans forming contracts with supernatural entities. Despite their otherworldly nature, Arakawa intended for her human characters to develop friendly bonds with the Daemons akin to ordinary human relationships, which became central to Yuru's dynamic with Left and Right. Her editor, being a fan of her earlier works, found it challenging to maintain a strictly professional relationship with her. Arakawa sought to limit the number of comedic elements in the manga in order to counterbalance the serious tone for which she was known; nevertheless, she appreciated comedy for the charm it added to her characters.

The concept of twins was one Arakawa had contemplated for some time before the manga began, and she wanted their origins to resemble mythological narratives, lending them a striking appeal. She considered various possibilities for their ages during the planning phase. To align with Asa's early antagonistic role, Arakawa chose to give her black hair and dark clothing; conversely, Yuru was assigned opposite colors to create a strong contrast. Some aspects of Yuru's personal development drew on Arakawa's own childhood experiences. She did not aim to present a curse narrative per se, but rather to evoke an unsettling atmosphere through the twins' origins. Because Yuru and Asa had been separated for an extended period, Arakawa did not write them as closely bonded siblings. Consequently, she did not regard them as having a conventional brother–sister relationship; instead, she depicted Asa as markedly polite toward Yuru, including the use of Japanese honorifics. Nevertheless, from the outset of the series, Arakawa had already determined that they would eventually develop into genuine equals.

Yuru's village is modeled after Takatori Castle

In writing Daemons of the Shadow Realm, Arakawa intended the narrative approach to contrast with that of her previous work, Fullmetal Alchemist. In the earlier series, the motivations of the main characters Edward and Alphonse Elric, along with other key details, were clearly established by the end of the first volume. In Daemons of the Shadow Realm, however, the narrative departs from this structure by keeping readers uninformed of essential information, thereby placing them in the same state of confusion as the protagonist, Yuru. Both the reader and the central character are thus caught up in circumstances they do not fully understand—a dynamic Arakawa intended from the first chapter. Although both series feature siblings as lead characters, their underlying systems differ substantially.

When crafting Yuru, Arakawa paid close attention to his background of being raised in the mountains and his consequent unfamiliarity with the modern world and the sea. She related to Yuru, having been born and raised in a mountainous region herself. Arakawa initially considered writing him with a modern sensibility but later recognized this as inappropriate; she cited the scene in which the protagonist sleeps in a closet after being wounded, comparing his town to the Edo period, as an example. This prompted her to verify numerous historical details and conduct further research in order to portray Yuru accurately. As a result, Yuru proved to be a challenging protagonist to write. Since Yuru's village was modeled on Takatori Castle in Nara Prefecture, he is rarely depicted near water—a detail that changes once he is taken to Tadera. Arakawa traveled to Takatori Castle for reference and found the conceptual work for Yuru particularly demanding. While writing the manga, she remained aware of the darkness of its world and sought to offer readers satisfying conclusions.

== Media ==
=== Manga ===
Written and illustrated by Hiromu Arakawa, Daemons of the Shadow Realm started in Square Enix's shōnen manga anthology magazine Monthly Shōnen Gangan on December 10, 2021. Square Enix has collected its chapters into individual tankōbon volumes. The first volume was released on June 10, 2022. As of November 12, 2026, 14 volumes have been released.

In July 2022, Square Enix Manga & Books announced that they licensed the series for English publication, with the first volume released on April 25, 2023.

==== Volumes ====
No.	Original release date	Original ISBN	English release date	English ISBN
1	June 10, 2022	978-4-7575-7962-0	April 25, 2023	978-1-64609-186-7
1. "Asa and Yuru" (アサとユル, Asa to Yuru); 2. "Right and Left" (右と左, Migi to Hidari); 3. "Dera and Hana" (デラとハナ, Dera to Hana); 4. "Ai and Makoto" (愛と誠, Ai to Makoto)
2	September 12, 2022	978-4-7575-8100-5	September 12, 2023	978-1-64609-222-2
5. "Jin and Yuru" (ジンとユル, Jin to Yuru); 6. "Hare and Tortoise" (兎と亀, Usagi to Kame); 7. "The Kagemori Clan and the Unknown Assailants" (影森家と謎の襲撃者, Kagemori-ke to Nazo no Shūgeki-sha); 8. "Loyalty and Bloodlust" (誠意と殺意, Seii to Satsui)
3	February 10, 2023	978-4-7575-8401-3	December 12, 2023	978-1-64609-244-4
9. "Asa and Break" (アサと｢解｣, Asa to "Kai"); 10. "Ink and Whiteout" (ベタとホワイト, Beta to Howaito); 11. "Suspicion and Conviction" (疑念と確信, Ginen to Kakushin); 12. "Embrace and Whisper" (抱擁と囁き, Hōyō to Sasayaki)
4	June 12, 2023	978-4-7575-8608-6	April 6, 2024	978-1-64609-259-8
13. "Long-Arm and Long-Leg" (手長と足長, Tenaga to Ashinaga); 14. "Ryuu and Ken" (リュウとケン, Ryū to Ken); 15. "Big Brother and Little Brother" (兄と弟, Ani to Otōto); 16. "Retainer and Shaman" (番(つがい)小者と祈祷師, Tsugaikomono to Kitōshi)
5	September 12, 2023	978-4-7575-8786-1	August 6, 2024	978-1-64609-299-4
17. "Daikyo and Shokyo" (大凶と小凶, Daikyō to Shōkyō; lit. 'Great Misfortune and Small Misfortune'); 18. "Family and Friends" (家族と友, Kazoku to Tomo); 19. "Yuru and Danji" (ユルとダンジ, Yuru to Danji); 20. "Asagiri and Yozakura" (朝霧と夜桜, Asagiri to Yozakura)
6	January 12, 2024	978-4-7575-8877-6; 978-4-7575-8878-3 (SE)	November 5, 2024	978-1-64609-310-6
21. "Kagemori and Shingo" (影森と新郷, Kagemori to Shingō); 22. "Assassin and Coffee" (刺客とコーヒー, Shikaku to Kōhī); 23. "Crybaby and Naughty Child" (泣く子と悪い子, Nakuko to Warui Ko); 24. "Fujin and Raijin" (風神と雷神, Fūjin to Raijin)
7	May 11, 2024	978-4-7575-9184-4	March 4, 2025	978-1-64609-382-3
25. "Sword and Bow" (刀と弓, Katana to Yumi); 26. "The Hunted and the Hunter" (逃亡者と追跡者, Tōbō-sha to Tsuiseki-sha); 27. "Killer and Cleaner" (殺し屋と始末屋, Koroshiya to Shimatsuya); 28. "Zashiki-warashi and Higashi Village" (ザシキワラシと東村, Zashiki-warashi to Higashi Mura)
8	September 12, 2024	978-4-7575-9412-8	July 1, 2025	978-1-64609-383-0
29. "The Kagemori Brothers and the Kuroya Siblings" (影森兄弟と黒谷(や)姉弟, Kagemori Kyōdai to Kuroya Kyōdai); 30. "Emotion and Reason" (情と理(ことわり), Jō to Kotowari); 31. "Higashi Village and Nishino Village" (東村と西ノ村, Higashi Mura to Nishino Mura; lit. 'East Village and West Village'); 32. "Gravedigger and Cleaner" (墓掘りと掃除屋, Hakahori to Sōjiya)
9	March 12, 2025	978-4-7575-9733-4	December 9, 2025	978-1-64609-428-8
33. "Fire and Water" (火と水, Hi to Mizu); 34. "Cutesy T-Shirt Man and Tracksuit Woman" (萌えT男とジャージ女, Moe Tī Otoko to Jāji Onna); 35. "Death and Rebirth" (死と再生, Shi to Saisei); 36. "Father and Son" (親父と息子, Oyaji to Musuko)
10	July 11, 2025	978-4-7575-9950-5	April 7, 2026	978-1-64609-498-1
37. "Reunion and Return" (再会と再訪, Saikai to Saihō); 38. "Hope and Despair" (期待と絶望, Kitai to Zetsubō); 39. "Ambition and Impatience" (功名心と焦燥感, Kōmyōshin to Shōsōkan); 40. "Inside and Outside" (裏と表, Ura to Hyō)
11	November 12, 2025	978-4-301-00162-1	August 11, 2026	979-8-89910-030-7
41. "Secrets and Silence" (秘密と沈黙, Himitsu to Chinmoku); 42. "Attack and Counterattack" (襲撃と逆襲, Shūgeki to Gyakushū); 43. "Heaven and Earth" (天と地, Ten to Chi); 44. "Snow and Blood" (雪と血, Yuki to Chi)
12	March 12, 2026	978-4-301-00381-6	January 12, 2027	979-8-89910-066-6
45. "Destruction and Creation" (破壊と創造, Hakai to Sōzō); 46. "Asa and Ivan" (アサとイワン, Asa to Iwan); 47. "Knife and Bomb" (ナイフと爆弾, Naifu to Bakudan); 48. "Victory and Defeat" (金星と敗北, Kinboshi to Haiboku)
13	July 10, 2026	978-4-3010-0634-3	—	—
49. "Grudge and Resentment" (怨みとつらみ, Urami to Tsurami); 50. "Cleanup and Farewell Letter" (後片付けと置き手紙, Atokatazuke to Okitegami); 51. "Departure and Escape" (家出と逃亡, Iede to Tōbō); 52. "Night and Sea" (夜と海, Yoru to Umi)
14	November 12, 2026	978-4-301-00873-6	—	—
53. "Hunting and Fishing" (猟と漁, Ryō to Ryō); 54. "Funadama-sama and Umibozu" (船だま様と海坊主, Funadama-sama to Umibōzu); 55. "Feast and Yearning" (宴と憧憬, Utage to Shōkei); 56. "Nirai Kanai and Land of Dead" (宴ニライカナイと黄泉の国, Nirai Kanai to Yomi no Kuni)

==== Chapters not yet in tankōbon format ====
These chapters have yet to be published in a tankōbon volume.

57. "Life and Names" (命と名前, Inochi to Namae)
58. "Cats and Condolence Gifts" (猫と香典, Neko to Kōden)
59. "Mother and Tornado" (母と竜巻, Haha to Tatsumaki)

=== Anime ===
An anime television series adaptation was announced during Crunchyroll's panel at Anime Expo in July 2025. The series is produced by Bones Film and directed by Masahiro Andō, with Noboru Takagi handling series composition, Nobuhiro Arai designing the characters, and Kenichiro Suehiro composing the music. Its first season aired from April 4 to September 19, 2026, on Tokyo MX and other networks, running for two consecutive cours. A second season has been announced.

== Reception ==
=== Popularity ===
By March 2026, the manga had over six million copies in circulation. By September 2026, it had over 7.5 million copies in circulation. By November 2026, it had over 8.5 million copies in circulation.

The series ranked 19th on the 2022 "Book of the Year" list by Da Vinci magazine. It ranked 15th in the 2023 edition of Takarajimasha's Kono Manga ga Sugoi! list of best manga for male readers; it ranked second on the 2024 edition. It ranked second in the Nationwide Bookstore Employees' Recommended Comics of 2023 list; it was ranked third in the 2024 list.

=== Critical response ===
Early critical response to the manga was positive as Francesco Cacciatore of Screen Rant named Daemons of the Shadow Realm as one of the best new manga titles to debut in 2021, highlighting the potential the manga shows despite only having one chapter released by the end of the year. Additionally, Cacciatore likened Daemons of the Shadow Realm to Koyoharu Gotouge's Demon Slayer: Kimetsu no Yaiba due to both series featuring a brother and sister pair as protagonists. Carlyle Edmundson of Screen Rant compared the concept of Tsugai present in the manga to that of Stands seen in Hirohiko Araki's JoJo's Bizarre Adventure series. Demelza of Anime UK News drew multiple comparisons between Yuru's story and that of Edward Elric from Fullmetal Alchemist, noting similarities not only in character design but also in the protagonists' progressive familiarization with supernatural concepts across their respective introductions. Parallels were identified between Yuru's Daemons and guardians and Edward's role as a State Alchemist within the military forces of Amestris in Arakawa's previous manga.

Víctor Teruel Sánchez of Akihabara Station praised Arakawa's ability to blend a dark narrative with comedic elements. He commended the handling of Yuru's capacity to control Daemons and escape his village, which lent the manga a distinct sense of mystery. The artwork also received positive responses, particularly with regard to both character designs and backgrounds. Demelza praised Arakawa's fight scene and background artwork. However, the writer criticized Arakawa's tendency to turn the characters into superdeformed forms, which affects the execution of the comedy. Carlyle Edmundson of Screen Rant praised how Arakawa combines Eastern and Western elements in the early chapters.

=== Accolades ===
The series won Rakuten Kobo's first E-book Manga Award in the "I Want to Read it Now! Featured Manga" category in 2023. It ranked second in the 2023 Next Manga Award in the print manga category. The series won the seventh Tsutaya Comic Award's grand prize in 2023. It was nominated for the 17th Manga Taishō in 2024, and placed second with 73 points. It was nominated for the 48th Kodansha Manga Award in the shōnen category in 2024.
