= Berserk (2016 TV series) =

2016 anime television series

- ベルセルク; Beruseruku
- Genre: Dark fantasy; Epic fantasy; Sword and sorcery
- Based on: Berserk by Kentaro Miura
- Developed by: Makoto Fukami
- Directed by: Shin Itagaki
- Voices of: Hiroaki Iwanaga; Takahiro Sakurai; Toa Yukinari; Kaoru Mizuhara
- Narrated by: Unshō Ishizuka
- Music by: Shirō Sagisu
- Country of origin: Japan
- Original language: Japanese
- No. of seasons: 2
- No. of episodes: 24

Production
- Producers: Shigeki Yamada; Hiroaki Takeuchi; Koutarō Hirugawa; Reo Kurosu; Dai Kawai; Toshihiro Maeda; Yutaka Endō; Shigeki Hosoda
- Cinematography: Mitsunobu Yoshida
- Animators: GEMBA; Millepensee
- Editor: Yuri Tamura
- Running time: 24 minutes
- Production companies: Liden Films (Note: General production); Hakusensha; Lucent Pictures Entertainment; NBCUniversal Entertainment Japan; Ultra Super Pictures; Koei Tecmo Games; Mainichi Broadcasting System; Wowow; D Anime Store

Original release
- Network: Wowow
- Release: 1 July 2016 – 23 June 2017

Related
- Berserk (1997 series); The Golden Age Arc (2012–2013 film trilogy)

Berserk (Japanese: ベルセルク, Hepburn: Beruseruku) is a Japanese anime television series based on Kentaro Miura's manga series Berserk. It continues on from the Golden Age Arc animated film trilogy. It aired from July to September 2016. The anime is the second television series adaptation of the manga after the 1997 anime, covering the Conviction story arc from the manga. A second season covering the first half of the Hawk of the Millennium Empire story arc aired from April to June 2017.

== Plot ==
The story follows Guts, also known as the "Black Swordsman", who was once a wandering mercenary taken in by the mercenary group known as the Band of the Hawk (鷹の団, Taka no Dan) and he fought alongside them before their mutilated leader, Griffith, sacrificed his followers to become one of the God Hand and continue his dream of ruling a kingdom of his own. Only Guts and his lover Casca, who lost her sanity and memory from the horrors she saw and endured, escaped the "Eclipse" ritual. However, they were branded with marks that attract evil, restless spirits and other similar entities. With Casca in the care of blacksmith Godo and his adopted daughter Erica as well as Rickert, the only member of the Hawks absent during the Eclipse, Guts set off to hunt down the God Hand's Apostles to find and kill Griffith in a quest for vengeance. Years have passed, and Guts is joined in his hunt by an elf named Puck as events the God Hand has long waited for are beginning to unfold.

== Voice cast ==
Character	Japanese	English
Guts	Hiroaki Iwanaga	Kaiji Tang
Griffith/Femto	Takahiro Sakurai	Steve Cannon
Casca	Toa Yukinari	Karen Strassman
Puck	Kaoru Mizuhara	Sarah Anne Williams
Farnese	Yōko Hikasa	Erica Lindbeck
Serpico	Kazuyuki Okitsu	Max Mittelman
Isidro	Hiro Shimono	Erik Scott Kimerer
Schierke	Chiwa Saito	Mela Lee
Ivalera	Satomi Arai	Tara Sands
Nosferatu Zodd	Kenta Miyake	Imari Williams
Skull Knight	Akio Ōtsuka	Taylor Henry
Grunbeld	Kiyoyuki Yanada	Paul St. Peter
Locus	Shougo Nakamura	D. C. Douglas
Rakshas	Masashi Nogawa	Frank Todaro
Sonia	Yoshino Nanjō	Skyler Davenport
Mule Wolflame	Mitsuki Saiga	Griffin Burns
Narrator	Unshō Ishizuka	Jake Eberle
Slan	Miyuki Sawashiro	Allegra Clark
Charlotte	Aki Toyosaki	Gina Bowes
Silat	Yuichi Nakamura	Lex Lang
Tapasa	Kōji Ishii	Taylor Henry
Azan	Hiroki Yasumoto	Richard Epcar
Luca	Miyuki Sawashiro	Wendee Lee
Nina	Natsumi Takamori	Ryan Bartley
Jerome	Daisuke Hirakawa	Todd Haberkorn
Erica	Ayana Taketatsu	Brianna Knickerbocker
Rickert	Minako Kotobuki	Erica Mendez
Godo	Takashi Inagaki	Abbot Kefford
Mozgus	Rikiya Koyama	Ray Chase
Flora	Sumi Shimamoto	Philece Sampler
Emperor Ganishka	Tesshō Genda	N/A

== Production ==
A new Berserk anime was announced in December 2015 in Hakusensha's Young Animal magazine, with a short preview trailer released at Comiket later the same month. The anime's website announced in February 2016 that the project would be a television series. A second trailer was streamed in March 2016. A teaser video was streamed on the series' website in early June 2016. At the conclusion of the first season's final episode, a teaser confirmed a second season for April 2017. The brief clip showed off the character Schierke and the Berserker armor, indicating the second season would adapt the next arc, "Hawk of the Millennium Empire".

Kentaro Miura, the author of the original manga, served as executive supervisor for the anime. The series is directed by Shin Itagaki and written by Makoto Fukami and Takashi Yamashita, with character designs provided by Hisashi Abe. Animation studio Liden Films produced the series, with GEMBA and Millepensee helming the animation production. Shirō Sagisu returns from the Berserk: The Golden Age Arc films to compose the music for the series, while Susumu Hirasawa, composer for the 1997 series and the Golden Age Arc films, returns to produce two songs for the series, titled "Ashes" (灰よ, Hai yo) and "Ash Crow". For the first season, the opening theme song, "Inferno", is performed by 9mm Parabellum Bullet, while the ending theme, "Meimoku no Kanata" (瞑目の彼方; lit. "Beyond Closed Eyes"), is performed by Nagi Yanagi. For second season, the opening theme song, "Sacrifice", performed by 9mm Parabellum Bullet, while the ending theme, "Issai wa Monogatari" (一切は物語; lit. "Everything Is the Story"), performed by Yoshino Nanjō featuring Nagi Yanagi.

The primary voice cast is reprising their roles from the Golden Age Arc film trilogy, while voice actor Unshō Ishizuka reprised his role as the narrator from the original anime.

Producer Reo Kurosu has described the show's animation style as "a hybrid between 2D and 3D", elaborating that "For this series, we're trying to do something new. The director is a 2D animator so what goes on in his mind and what he puts on the storyboard is all in 2D. From there it's all about choosing which tool to use between full CG animation, traditional 2D, or a hybrid of the two. The director and the 2D and 3D studios would meet and discuss what to use depending on what we're trying to accomplish with each scene." The 3D characters and objects are rendered with cel shading to make them look more like 2D animation. A particular feature is that the shadows on 3D objects contain a linear hatching effect that simulates shading with a pen or pencil, and the same hatching effect is applied to the shadows that appear on any 2D models to create a more uniform look.

== Broadcast and distribution ==
The first 12-episode season premiered on 1 July 2016 on Wowow, and one week later on MBS's Animeism programming block, TBS, CBC, and BS-TBS. The second season of the series began airing on April 7, 2017, with an hour-long two episode premiere.

The series is simulcast on Crunchyroll. Crunchyroll announced at the annual Anime Expo on 1 July 2016 that the company would be releasing the series with an English dub on Blu-ray and DVD.

On March 17, 2017, IGN released a clip of the Berserk English dub and was announced that the series would be distributed by Funimation, but the series was dubbed by Bang Zoom! Entertainment. This marks the first time NYAV Post had no involvement in dubbing Berserk media since Sword of the Berserk. The first season was available on March 20 by Funimation.

== Episodes ==
Season	Episodes	Originally released	
Season	Episodes	First released	Last released
1	12	1 July 2016	16 September 2016
2	12	7 April 2017	23 June 2017

=== Season 1 (2016) ===
No. overall	No. in season	Title	Directed by	Written by	Storyboarded by	Original release date
1	1	"The Dragonslayer"; Transliteration: "Ryūkoroshi no Taiken" (Japanese: 竜殺しの大剣)	Atsushi Satō	Makoto Fukami	Shin Itagaki	1 July 2016
A few years after the events of a solar eclipse, one that foretold the coming of an angel of darkness, a lone swordsman named Guts walks into an inn where a group of bandits are tormenting an elf named Puck and a red-haired youth. Guts trounces the thugs and takes his leave, inspiring Puck to travel with the swordsman while the youth is unable to follow. Accepting a ride from an old priest named Adolf, Guts experiences a nightmare and wakes up to an attack by spiritually possessed skeletons, which kill Adolf and his daughter Colette. After he defeats the skeletons and a tree animated by pagan spirits, Guts is surrounded by the Holy Iron Chain Knights, who have been tracking him since the day they investigated the aftermath of the eclipse on behalf of the Holy See.
2	2	"The Holy Iron Chain Knights"; Transliteration: "Seitessa Kishidan" (Japanese: 聖鉄鎖騎士団)	Hisashi Egawa	Makoto Fukami	Shin Itagaki & Kazuya Ichikawa	8 July 2016
Still fatigued from fighting spirits, Guts kills several of the Holy Iron Chain Knights attempting to capture him and fights their vice commander Azan, but ultimately collapses from his wounds. At the knights' camp, their leader, Farnese, interrogates Guts for answers about the demise of the Band of the Hawk, having found the mercenary group's bloodied remains after the solar eclipse. But Guts mocks Farnese about her authority and her faith, provoking her to whip him in rage before Azan stops her and locks Guts in a cage. Guts is freed by Puck at nightfall and takes Farnese as a hostage to escape. Only the knights' herald Serpico gives chase, before finding himself surrounded by pursuing spirits.
3	3	"Night of Miracles"; Transliteration: "Kiseki no Yoru" (Japanese: 奇跡の夜)	Hisashi Egawa	Makoto Fukami	Shin Itagaki	15 July 2016
The spirits pass Serpico and possess hounds that chase Guts to an abandoned mansion, the swordsman killing the dogs before facing the estate's kennel master: an Apostle. Guts kills the Apostle while Farnese flees in terror at the sight of the swordsman torturing him for the God Hand's whereabouts. Guts finds Farnese about to raped by their possessed horse, killing the animal as its act brought back horrible memories. A spirit then possesses Farnese and forces her to act out her lust by straddling Guts until sunrise. Serpico retrieves a traumatized Farnese and escorts her back to their camp, allowing Guts a reprieve despite Farnese's demand to have him killed. Meanwhile, in the city of Windham, the King of Midland dies having seen a vision about Griffith's return while the Kushan army appears on the horizon.
4	4	"Revelations"; Transliteration: "Keiji" (Japanese: 啓示)	Hisashi Egawa	Makoto Fukami	Kenichi Kawamura	22 July 2016
Guts has a nightmare of his beloved Casca being burned at the stake as a witch. When he wakes, the monstrous fetus from his earlier nightmare tells him that she is in danger. Guts returns to the home of Godo the blacksmith where Erika and Rickert confess that Casca has escaped from the cave where she was confined. The bedridden Godo tells Guts that he made a grave mistake by abandoning Casca while he tried to drown his sorrow with revenge. After Godo uses his last strength to repair his sword, Guts departs to St. Albion to find Casca. Meanwhile, Farnese and her knights see the flood of refugees from Midland's disasters to St. Albion while escorting the inquisitor Bishop Mozgus to the city. While Mozgus punishes accused heretics who attempted to kill him, the prostitute Luca finds Casca wandering alone.
5	5	"Tower of Conviction"; Transliteration: "Danzai no Tō" (Japanese: 断罪の塔)	Atsushi Satō	Makoto Fukami	Shin Itagaki	29 July 2016
Guts kills some Kushan scouts while passing through to St. Albion, and ends up being followed by the red-haired youth Isidro out of admiration. In Albion, with the surrounding refugee camp in utter disarray from the starved and over-populated masses, Mozgus begins his task in the Tower of Conviction where "sinful" beggars are tortured. Meanwhile, Luca divides earnings from her client Jerome among her fellows. Calling Casca "Elaine" while presenting her as her bandaged and diseased sister for her well being, Luca entrusts the girl to her fellow Nina, who is treating her own disease, while she fetches water. At nightfall, as Casca's brand attracted spiritually-animated corpses near the bank that Nina is fetching water from, Guts and Isidro are ambushed by the wheel-bound corpses of Mozgus' victims.
6	6	"Night Banquet of Burning at the Stake"; Transliteration: "Hiaburi no Yaen" (Japanese: 火あぶりの夜宴)	Atsushi Satō	Takashi Yamashita	Shin Itagaki	5 August 2016
As Casca is saved by the monstrous fetus and Guts defeats his enemies, he encounters the mysterious Skull Knight who reveals the God Hand are using St. Albion as the site of a ritual to restore Griffith's corporeal form. The next day, as Farnese finds herself struggling with her faith, Nina meets her reoccurring customer Joachim and tests his love for her by bringing him to a midnight orgy held by the pagan cult's goat-headed leader. Joachim gradually engages until learning that the pagans are cannibals and tries to flee, falling off a cliff. Nina breaks down before seeing Luca, who disciplines her before forgiving her, and then learns that Casca followed her. Casca nearly gets raped by the pagans but is saved by spirits attracted by her brand. The fetus dispersed the spirits with the surviving pagans assuming Casca to be a witch.
7	7	"The Black Witch"; Transliteration: "Kuroki Majo" (Japanese: 黒き魔女)	Kōjirō Tsuruoka	Makoto Fukami	Shin Itagaki	12 August 2016
As Luca tries to defend her apprentice Pepe when she is being arrested by a Holy Knight, Guts arrives at St. Albion and dispatches the soldiers. Luca takes Guts to her tent upon recognizing his brand, only to find that a fearful Nina abducted Casca. The group divides to search; Isidro and Puck find Nina and Casca when they are captured by the pagan cult. In their cave, the pagans intend to marry Casca to the Great Goat with Nina as a sacrificial offering, but Isidro distracts the pagans while Puck goes after Guts. When Farnese and her knights, led by Joachim, arrive, Casca's brand awakens the dead which possess some pagans to indiscriminately attack people. Isidro attempts to save Casca, while the Great Goat is transformed into a monster by a mysterious observer. When the Great Goat attempts to consummate his marriage, Guts arrives to save Casca.
8	8	"Reunion in the Den of Evil"; Transliteration: "Makutsu no Saikai" (Japanese: 魔窟の再会)	Tetsuya Nakano	Makoto Fukami	Shin Itagaki	19 August 2016
Guts' reunion with Casca is short-lived as he holds off the Great Goat while Isidro gets Casca and Nina to safety. After killing the Great Goat, Guts attempts to catch up with the others when he crosses paths with Serpico on a cliff side. Serpico reveals he has been seeking to kill the Black Swordsman and has prepared the duel in his favor due to the terrain and Guts' current state. Guts finally manages to drive Serpico off upon disarming him. He learns from Isidro that Casca and Nina were captured by the Holy Iron Chain Knights and taken to the Tower of Conviction. While Guts, Isidro and Luca approach the tower to rescue them, Nina is to be interrogated on the identity of the Black Witch. The mysterious observer awaits for the fruition of his work.
9	9	"Blood Flow of the Dead"; Transliteration: "Mōja no Ketsuryū" (Japanese: 亡者の血流)	Hisashi Egawa	Takashi Yamashita	Shin Itagaki	26 August 2016
After Nina named her as the witch he seeks, Mozgus places Casca in an iron maiden. But it causes the spirits of the tortured to manifest as a flesh-eating blob of blood. While Luca and Isidro use Jerome to free Nina, Guts forces Farnese to take him to the torture chamber where Puck tells him Casca is still alive. With Casca trapped inside it, the blood moves up the tower as Mozgus and his men are then transformed by the observer. Mozgus burns away some of the blood with his flames, freeing Casca and saving Luca's group, but he intends to have the former burned at the stake while his men attack the latter. Luca sacrificed herself so Jerome can save Nina, only to be saved by the Skull Knight as he was about to attack the observer. Guts arrives soon after and faces Mozgus as the inquisitor's group all sprout wings.
10	10	"Hell's Angels"; Transliteration: "Herusu Enjerusu" (Japanese: ヘルス・エンジェルス)	Hisashi Egawa	Takashi Yamashita	Shin Itagaki	2 September 2016
Luca is spirited away by the mysterious observer, who reveals himself as a Behelit-like Apostle self-dubbed the Egg of the Perfect World. The Egg tells Luca his story of long observation of everyone in St. Albion, detailing his ideals and the event to soon occur. After the Egg flees with only a mortal wound he inflicts on the Apostle, the Skull Knight takes Luca to safety as the living mounds of starved corpses rise up. Back in the Tower of Conviction, while the other disciples deal with Guts, Mozgus and the Twins fly off with Casca. Though Guts manages to kill Mozgus' disciples, the possessed blood causes the tower to partially collapse. The chaos unfolds in the slums, but Mozgus uses his powers to keep the corpses at bay while the refugees proceed to build a pyre to burn Casca on. Guts sees this while noticing the four senior members of the God Hand manifesting through the blood.
11	11	"Shadows of Ideas"; Transliteration: "Idea no Kage" (Japanese: イデアの影)	Tetsuya Nakano & Atsushi Satō	Makoto Fukami	Shin Itagaki & Kazuya Ichikawa	9 September 2016
As Luca walks back to St. Albion after the Skull Knight took her to the outskirts, the Egg of the Perfect World swallows the dying Demon Child out of sympathy during his climb up the Tower of Conviction. At the same time, enlisting Jerome and Nina's help, Isidro uses a makeshift pulley system to free Casca as she was about to be burned alive. Mozgus nearly catches them when Guts leaps off the tower and impales the inquisitor. But Mozgus' bible shielded him from the attack while he fully transforms. After Isidro's group eliminate the last of Mozgus' disciples, the inquisitor overpowering him while the flames keeping the corpses at bay die out, Guts uses his miniature bombs to blow apart the unprotected chink in the inquisitor's armored body to kill him. After a brief reunion with Casca, the corpses manage to flood into St. Albion as Guts gives his group torches so they can outlast the few remaining hours of night.
12	12	"Those Who Cling, Those Who Struggle"; Transliteration: "Sugaru-mono, Mogaku-mono" (Japanese: すがるもの、もがくもの)	Hisashi Egawa & Kōjirō Tsuruoka	Makoto Fukami	Shin Itagaki	16 September 2016
As Guts and his group fend off the flood of corpses with fire while Luca saves Nina down below the tower, the Egg of the Perfect World calls the dead to the Tower of Conviction and sacrifices himself to complete the ritual with the Demon Child becoming Griffith's corporeal vessel. The Tower collapses once the ritual ran its course, killing everyone inside it before daybreak as Guts and the others find themselves surrounded by Silat and his Kushans before the Apostle Nosferatu Zodd appears to fend Kushans off. Guts then sees a newly reconstituted Griffith, yet could not attack him due to Casca while the others use the Apostle's appearance to flee as a Kushan legion arrives. Zodd spirits Griffith away on his back while Guts steals a horse to take Casca back to Godo's home. Isidro departs on his own while Luca pays her respects the Egg and those who died that night. While Nina reunites with Joachim, Farnese renounces her faith and decides to follow Guts with Serpico remaining by her side. Back at Albion's ruins, the Skull Knight muses that the events which occurred will soon change the world.

=== Season 2 (2017) ===
No. overall	No. in season	Title	Directed by	Written by	Storyboarded by	Original release date
12.5	0	"Berserk TV Series 2nd Season Start Commemorative Special"; Transliteration: ""Beruseruku" Terebi Shirīzu Dai Ni-Ki Sutāto Kinen Tokuban" (Japanese: ｢ベルセルク｣ TVシリーズ第2期スタート記念特番)	N/A	N/A	N/A	7 April 2017
A recap special covering the first season
13	1	"The Rent World"; Transliteration: "Hokorobu Sekai" (Japanese: ほころぶ世界)	Hisashi Egawa	Makoto Fukami	Shin Itagaki	7 April 2017
Guts and Puck take Casca back to Godo's home to find Godo has died. Griffith appears, wanting to know how meeting Guts would feel, and is pleased that he feels nothing and can continue to pursue his dream. Guts attempts to kill him but is stopped by Zodd who he duels fiercely until Zodd's sword shatters against the Dragonslayer. Zodd destroys Godo's iron mine and home. Griffith ponders whether the feelings he has are caused by the Demon Child who became his vessel and saves Casca from being crushed by falling rocks. He then offers Rickert a place in the new Band of the Hawks before leaving with Zodd. Guts reveals to Rickert how Griffith took his eye and left arm, sacrificed their comrades and raped Casca but refuses Rickert's offer to help get revenge. With the mine destroyed, as it was the only means to protect her from the spirits, Guts sees no other recourse but to take Casca with him to Puck's homeland. Elsewhere in the kingdom Kushan soldiers destroy a castle, kill the citizens and capture the women until Griffith arrives and is hailed by the people as the Hawk of Light.
14	2	"Winter Journey"; Transliteration: "Fuyu no Tabiji" (Japanese: 冬の旅路)	Hisashi Egawa	Makoto Fukami	Shin Itagaki	7 April 2017
A young witch, Schierke, watches Griffith from a distance. While tracking Guts, Serpico remembers how he was taken in as a servant to the Vandimion family by Farnese despite her abusing him, revealing himself to the patriarch Federico de Vandimion III as his illegitimate son. Serpico promises not to divulge this to Farnese while eventually becoming her bodyguard. Farnese later ends up being sent to a nunnery after setting fire to the estate to escape being engaged to a member of the royal family. She later returns to join the Holy Iron Chain Knights, eventually forcing Serpico to burn his ailing mother who was tried as a witch. As a result of their brands being so close together, attracting stronger evil spirits, Guts is having trouble keeping them at bay as the Beast of Darkness, the personification of his inner darkness, tempts him to kill Casca so they can resume hunting down Griffith. Guts' rage overwhelms him and he hurts Casca while momentarily possessed, destroying her trust in him and she runs away. She is caught and almost raped by bandits, causing her to remember being raped by Griffith and she slaughters the bandits before attacking Guts. Guts is again overwhelmed by rage and almost rapes Casca before regaining control of himself. They are later found by Isidro, Farnese and Serpico who ask for permission to accompany Guts on his mission.
15	3	"Banner of the Flying Sword"; Transliteration: "Hi Ken no Mihata" (Japanese: 飛剣の御旗)	Hisashi Egawa	Takashi Yamashita	Shin Itagaki	14 April 2017
A Kushan occupied city is liberated by Griffith and his new Band of the Hawk: Composed of Nosferatu Zodd, Sir Locus the Moonlight Knight; the exiled Bakiraka assassin Rakshas, Grunbeld the Giant; and Irvine the Archer. Joined by the clairvoyant girl Sonia, the Hawks later dealt with a Kushan legion that overwhelmed Midlanders under the command of Mule Wolflame. Though Mule was upset to learn Kushan prisoners are given a choice to join Griffith's army, and that some of the army's members are demonic cannibals, Mule was mesmerized by seeing Griffith holding final rites for the fallen whose spirits depart while bidding farewell to their families. Mule is overcome with emotion from being in Griffith's presence, immediately pledging his loyalty to him. Meanwhile, after Farnese cuts her hair to prove her resolve, Guts allows her, Serpico, and Isidro to travel with him as he no longer trusts himself to protect Casca on his own. Guts does warn them that travelling with him means they would not be able to sleep at night, the group later fending off attacking specters after nightfall.
16	4	"Forest of Demonic Beasts"; Transliteration: "Kemono Oni no Mori" (Japanese: 獣鬼の森)	Yuichi Kameyama	Takashi Yamashita	Shin Itagaki	21 April 2017
Farnese becomes depressed after Casca disappears and she gets lost in the forest trying to find her. A shepherd warns Guts group about an imminent battle between Griffith's army and the Kushan's along with trolls infesting a nearby area. Serpico admits to Guts he desires to kill him in a fair duel, but as long as Farnese desires to stay with Guts he will treat him as an ally. Isidro practices dueling with Guts. A group of trolls attack but are driven away by the witch, Schierke, whom Isidro manages to insult, and her elf companion, Ivalera, before disappearing. Casca continues to be afraid of Guts and becomes attached to Farnese. They come across an old man named Morgan whose village is being attacked by trolls, searching aid from a witch as the local lord took his army to support Griffith. Almost immediately they stumble upon Schierke's house as Casca and Guts brands allow them to pass through her protective barrier. Guts mistakenly believes Schierke's earth golems are ghouls and destroys several of them before Schierke reveals herself as an apprentice to the elderly witch Flora who has been waiting for Guts and Casca to arrive.
17	5	"The Astral World"; Transliteration: "Yūkai − Kakuriyo" (Japanese: 幽界ーかくりよ)	Hisashi Egawa	Makoto Fukami	Shin Itagaki	28 April 2017
Flora learns of the attacks on Enoch Village and offers Morgan the aid of her apprentice, Schierke, then casts a spell that will temporarily protect Guts and Casca from spirits. Flora explains their plane of existence exists alongside the Astral Plane, the home of supernatural beings, and the Realm of Ideas which all creation is derived. Guts shows Flora the Behelit and she says that it is a gateway to link the physical world with the Plane where the God Hand dwells, and that its senior members were once human like Griffith and answer to a higher power within the deepest layer of the Astral Plane. Schierke assumes Griffith is the fifth angel prophesied by the Holy See. The next day, Guts' group receive magical weapons: Serpico a cloak and sword imbued with Sylphs, Isidro a dagger imbued with Salamanders, and Farnese a silver short-sword along with silver chain mail and tunics for herself and Casca as protection from spirits. Guts refuses a battle-axe, preferring to keep his sword, and leaves with the others for Enoch Village. Flora meets her friend, The Skull Knight, who requests a favor regarding Guts.
18	6	"Fight for Survival Against the Demonic Legion"; Transliteration: "Ma-gun to no Shitō" (Japanese: 魔群との死闘)	Hisashi Egawa & Shingo Tanabe	Makoto Fukami	Shin Itagaki	5 May 2017
Guts' group arrive at Enoch Village, but are almost turned away by the priest who claims that Schierke is a fake, but he allows them to stay when Guts claims that Casca is a religious pilgrim. While training, Isidro talks with Morgan about his past and dreams for the future. Schierke expresses distaste of the local church which was built on the site of a spirit temple in an attempt by the Holy See to expand their authority. This included exiling Flora to the forest. The trolls attack and everyone flees to the church. Guts, Farnese, Serpico and Isidro fight the trolls while Schierke shows concern about the source of Guts' strength and the dark shadows that cling to the Dragonslayer. Schierke's use of magic angers the priest who tries to stop her, only to end up trapped on the roof along with Schierke, Farnese and Casca. While fighting a troll Isidro overbalances trying to swing his sword and Morgan is injured. Schierke finishes casting her spell, summoning four Guardian Angels whose protective light crumbles the trolls to ashes and heals Morgan's injuries.
19	7	"The Arcana of Invocation"; Transliteration: "Inori no Ōgi" (Japanese: 祈りの奥義)	Makoto Satō & Shingo Tanabe	Makoto Fukami	Shin Itagaki	12 May 2017
The village comes under attack from an Ogre and a Kelpie. Serpico fights the kelpie and Guts fights the ogre. Schierke sends her mind into the spirit realm and senses Undines, powerful water spirits, and allows herself to be possessed by the river spirit known as the Lady of the Depths, who uses Schierke to flood the river, washing the trolls, kelpie and ogre back into the underworld. But the magic is too powerful for Schierke to stop, Ivalera having Farnese use Schierke's staff to help return her to reality. Just as Schierke returns, Casca and Farnese fall into the water and are swept away. Schierke tracks Casca and Farnese with magic and senses that they have been captured by more trolls. Despite the villagers' gratitude, Schierke feels responsible for the destruction caused by her inexperience and she receives permission from the priest to build a shrine to appease the angry water spirits. Isidro receives a small sword from Morgan that is easier for him to fight with. Serpico's injuries force him to remain in the village while Guts, Schierke and Isidro leave to rescue Casca and Farnese.
20	8	"The Corruption of Qliphoth"; Transliteration: "Kurifoto no Odaku" (Japanese: クリフォトの汚濁)	Makoto Satō & Shingo Tanabe	Kenzen	Shin Itagaki	19 May 2017
Schierke realises they have entered a part of the Astral Realm called Qliphoth where humanity's darkest thoughts manifest. She manages to telepathically communicate with Farnese and Casca in the trolls' cave where the trolls impregnate human women with their troll offspring. While the others help women escape, Guts remains behind to kill the trolls. Schierke begins a spell to summon the Lord of Rotting Roots to seal the cave. Slan of the God Hand manifests herself from Troll guts as she overwhelms Guts, sensually teasing him and tempting him to use the Behelit to become an Apostle. The Skull Knight intervenes and Guts shoots Slan with his arm cannon. As Slan heals herself, the Skull Knight tells Guts to use his Dragonslayer as the countless Apostles it has slain have made it effective against beings like the Godhand. Guts impales Slan who kisses him before her physical vessel dissolves, promising they will meet again. Schierke tries to slow the Lord of Rotting Roots so Guts can escape but the cave collapses. The Skull Knight reveals his Sword of Actuation, created from the Behelits he had ingested, to get himself and Guts out of the cave. After returning the women to Enoch Village, Guts admits that he is glad he has comrades again.
21	9	"The Berserker Armor"; Transliteration: "Bāsākā no Katchū" (Japanese: 狂戦士の甲冑)	Shingo Tanabe	Takashi Yamashita	Shin Itagaki	26 May 2017
Flora reveals a suit of Berserker armour she has guarded over the years, finishing final preparations as the Skull Knight faces Griffith's Apostles after they break through her barrier. Guts suddenly collapses from the spiritual wound Slan inflicted, Schierke astonished that Guts could even walk after facing one of the Godhand. Meanwhile. Schierke senses that Flora's barrier has disappeared and the house is now on fire. Guts rushes to aid the Skull Knight in battle against Zodd and Grunbeld while Schierke and the others rush to find Flora. Grunbeld insists on duelling with Guts while Zodd fights the Skull Knight. Flora allows herself to be consumed in the fire while instructing Schierke to give Guts the armour. In his weakened state, Guts cannot fight and Grunbeld breaks his ribs. Schierke's earth Golems come to Guts' rescue, distracting Grunbeld and allowing Guts to flee. Despite knowing the incredible risks involved, Schierke encases the near lifeless Guts within the armour, allowing him to re-join the battle and he slays several Apostles with ease. While Guts is aware that his body is severely damaged, he no longer cares about pain as the armor becomes molding itself in the image of the Beast of Darkness.
21.5	9.5	"The Witch's Recollection"; Transliteration: "Majo no Tsuisō" (Japanese: 魔女の追想)	N/A	N/A	N/A	2 June 2017
A recap special covering the first 21 episodes and narrated by Schierke
22	10	"A Journey Begins in Flames"; Transliteration: "Honō no Tabidachi" (Japanese: 炎の旅立ち)	Shingo Tanabe	Takashi Yamashita	Shin Itagaki	9 June 2017
With the armour removing his limitations, Guts goes all out as he manages to damage Grunbeld's shield and hammer while wounding him. Schierke explains that as Guts is fighting without limits he is tearing his own body apart, and while the armour removes his pain he will eventually bleed to death. Grunbeld transforms into his Apostle form, a dragon with corundum scales. Guts stops a blow from Grunbeld's tail and cracks the scales on his face with one swing. Schierke casts her mind into the spirit realm and sees Guts's ego trapped inside the Beast of Darkness, but a spell cast by Flora has prevented Guts ego from vanishing. Schierke reminds him of his love for Casca and Guts awakens. He flees from Grunbeld and saves his friends while Flora's spirit holds Grunbeld back with spirit fire. In the City of Windham, an underground resistance meet with Laban of the Midland Arklaw Knights to ask his help in rescuing Princess Charlotte. They are attacked by demons but are saved by Irvine the Archer and Sir Locus for an unknown reason. A month later, Guts has healed but still wears the armour with Schierke fearing for his life should he fight again.
23	11	"Proclaimed Omens"; Transliteration: "Tsuge-rareshi Kizashi" (Japanese: 告げられし兆し)	Shingo Tanabe	Takashi Yamashita	Shin Itagaki	16 June 2017
Guts and party resume their journey to Puck's home, an island called Skellig that exists between the planes and is home to both elves and mages. Farnese asks Schierke to teach her to use magic as they spend the night at a beach. The Skull Knight, assumed to be the armor's previous wearer, warns Guts of the effects of using the Berserker Armor. He also reveals Griffith is targeting witches like Flora as threats to his power and that Casca's sanity might be restored by Skellig's ruler Hanafubuku, though he cryptically warns Guts that Casca might not want her mind restored. At night they are attacked by giant humanoid crocodiles, revealed to be spirit-infused animals known as Pishaca that controlled by Kushan sorcerers. Schierke casts a protection spell as Guts, struggling to keep the Beast of Darkness from taking his body over, fights the crocodiles with Isidro while Serpico kills the Kushan mages to render the Pishaca docile. But the head Kushan sorcerer, Daiba, summons a elephantine possessed whale called a Makara to attack. This causes Guts to lose control as the Berserker Armor activates and he slaughters the Makara and some of the crocodiles. Guts almost attacks his friends but Schierke manages to snap him out of it at the last second. Guts becomes furious at himself for losing control again.
24	12	"City of Humans"; Transliteration: "Ningen no Toshi" (Japanese: 人間の都市)	Shingo Tanabe	Makoto Fukami	Shin Itagaki	23 June 2017
Guts' group approach the city of Vritannis, where Isidro upsets Schierke about her witch's clothing. Schierke learns that Vritannis traded in Kushan slaves, but all the slaves have been hanged as religious enemies of the Holy See. She is seen cremating the Kushans by Sonia who expresses admiration towards the girl for freeing the dead souls. She and Schierke bond over their experiences not fitting in with normal people until they both found someone who accepted them, i.e. Griffith and Guts. Schierke stops pirates from kidnapping Kushan children and is saved by Isidro who had been trying to find her. Isidro uses his new sword to skillfully fight the pirates until Mule Wolflame arrives searching for Sonia and they defeat the pirate captain, all secretly witnessed by Guts. Sonia asks Schierke to accompany her but Schierke turns her down to stay with Guts. Sonia warns Schierke to leave Vritannis quickly and shows her a vision of Vritannis burning. Later Schierke dresses in human clothes and she, Casca and Farnese are protected from drunken soldiers by Guts. Schierke is happy that while she may be surrounded by human suffering she can continue to smile with her new friends.

== Reception ==
IGN contributor Meghan Sullivan rated the opening episode 8.5 out of 10, praising the direction, stating "despite the somewhat distracting visuals, 'The Branded Swordsman' gets Guts' quest for vengeance off to a strong start".

Cecilia D'Anastasio applauded the opening episode in Kotaku, saying it "already outshines the 90's original". Though, noting the series' sub-par animation quality, D'Anastasio concluded, "Berserk is not for the faint-hearted. But 'The Branded Swordsman' proved to me that directors of fighting-heavy anime are making more of an effort to beautify and civilize the genre, doing justice to manga that showcases writing and ingenuity."

Anime News Network contributor Jacob Hope Chapman was critical of the show's production quality in his review of episodes 1–3, stating that "Berserk 2016 is an abominably ugly and almost forcefully unpleasant realization of our dreams, with cut-rate CGI, questionable music choices, and disorienting camera work". However, to him, the strength of the source work helps to carry the show, and Itagaki's frenetic directing style at least keeps the action interesting: "Once you manage to unclench your teeth at all those garish cel-shaded puppet bodies smacking against each other, Miura's compelling story and the captivating world still shine as one-of-a-kind flights of dark images with poignant characterization, even as they struggle under such a lackluster production."
