= Berserk (1997 TV series) =

Japanese anime television series

- 剣風伝奇ベルセルク; Kenpū Denki Beruseruku
- Type: TV series
- Genre: Dark fantasy; Epic fantasy; Sword and sorcery
- Based on: Berserk
- Created by: Kentaro Miura
- Directed by: Naohito Takahashi
- Character designers: Yoshihiko Umakoshi; Norihiro Matsubara
- Music by: Susumu Hirasawa
- Voices of: Nobutoshi Canna; Toshiyuki Morikawa; Yūko Miyamura; Akiko Yajima; Akira Ishida; Masuo Amada; Tomohiro Nishimura; Kenji Utsumi
- Opening theme: "Tell Me Why" by Penpals
- Ending theme: "Waiting So Long" by Silver Fins
- No. of episodes: 25 (list of episodes)

Production
- Art director: Shichirō Kobayashi
- Sound director: Satoshi Katō
- Cinematographer: Mitsunobu Yoshida
- Color designers: Ryoji Miyazaki (1–12); Yukiko Nagahama (13–25)
- Animation producer: Shukichi Kanda
- Studio: OLM Team Iguchi
- Producers: Toshiaki Okuno; Toshio Nakatani
- Production companies: Nippon Television; VAP
- Runtime: 23 minutes

Original release
- Network: NTV
- Release: October 8, 1997 – April 1, 1998

Berserk, known in Japan as Kenpū Denki Berserk, (Note: Japanese: 剣風伝奇ベルセルク, Hepburn: Kenpū Denki Beruseruku; 'Sword-Wind Chronicle Berserk') is a Japanese anime television series, based on Kentaro Miura's manga series Berserk. The story follows Guts, a skilled mercenary warrior, as he joins the Band of the Hawk, a mercenary group led by the ambitious Griffith.

Berserk was produced by Nippon Television and VAP, animated by Oriental Light and Magic and directed by Naohito Takahashi. It was broadcast for 25 episodes on Nippon TV from October 1997 to April 1998. Berserk was formerly licensed for English release in North America by Media Blasters, and later acquired by Discotek Media.

The series has received critical acclaim, and has frequently been listed as one of the greatest anime series of all time. Critics have praised its storytelling, characters, setting, and soundtrack by Susumu Hirasawa.

== Plot ==
Guts, a lone mercenary warrior driven solely by his will to survive, becomes entangled with the Band of the Hawk, a mercenary group led by the ambitious and charismatic Griffith. Guts quickly becomes Griffith's most trusted warrior, drawn in by his dream to rule a kingdom. In the aftermath of a battle that nearly cost Guts and Griffith their lives, Griffith begins getting closer to the King of Midland's daughter, Princess Charlotte. At one point, Guts overhears Griffith telling Charlotte that he considers a true friend to be someone who has their own dream. Hired full-time by the kingdom of Midland, the Hawks help to win a hundred-year war against the Tudor empire. Eventually, Guts develops a closer relationship with Casca, the Hawks' unit commander and only female member. Some time after the Hawks' victory, Guts decides to leave the group and stop living for Griffith's dream. Griffith challenges Guts to make him desist, but Guts easily defeats him. Psychologically devastated, Griffith, in a lapse of judgment, has sex with Charlotte while unaware that he is being observed. Consequently, Griffith is imprisoned and tortured, and the rest of the Hawks are marked for death.

After training for a year to become a better swordsman, Guts learns that the Hawks have become outlaws. He goes to their aid, and together with Casca, they seek to rescue Griffith. They manage to find him mutilated, disfigured and rendered mute. As the Hawks feel helpless due to Griffith's condition, Casca tells Guts that she must take care of Griffith and that Guts should continue his own path. Overhearing them, Griffith takes off in a wagon and crashes into a river. He crawls out of the wreckage and attempts to commit suicide by stabbing his throat into a sharp tree root. At that very moment, he finds his Behelit—a mysterious demonic relic, lost during his time imprisoned—and unintentionally activates it with the blood leaking from his neck. This unleashes an event known as "the Eclipse", taking everyone present to another plane of existence. The God Hand, a group of archdemons, informs Griffith that he has been chosen as their final member and to accept this power, he must offer his comrades as a sacrifice. The Hawks are branded as sacrificial offerings then brutally slaughtered and devoured by the "Apostles"—humans transformed into powerful demons by sacrificing their loved ones and their own humanity. Only Guts and Casca remain alive, and Griffith—reborn as the fifth God Hand member, Femto—rapes Casca in front of Guts, who is restrained by an Apostle latched onto his arm. Guts loses his left arm and right eye in a futile attempt to save Casca. In a flashforward, Guts is shown to have survived the Eclipse. Now being known as the "Black Swordsman", Guts begins a quest for revenge against the God Hand and the Apostles.

== Voice cast ==
Character	Japanese voice	English voice
Guts	Nobutoshi Canna	Marc Diraison
Griffith	Toshiyuki Morikawa	Kevin T. Collins
Casca	Yūko Miyamura	Carrie Keranen
Rickert	Akiko Yajima	Michelle Newman
Judeau	Akira Ishida	Christopher Kromer
Pippin	Masuo Amada	Jeff Ward
Corkus	Tomohiro Nishimura	Mark Sebastian
Nosferatu Zodd	Kenji Utsumi	J. David Brimmer
Void	Unshō Ishizuka	John Avner
Slan	Atsuko Tanaka	C.L. Jones
Ubik	Chafurin	Christian Collingwood
Gaston	Masahito Kawanago	Sean Schemmel

== Release ==
Berserk was produced by Nippon Television and VAP, animated by Oriental Light and Magic, and directed by Naohito Takahashi. The series begins with the original manga's Black Swordsman arc, continuing through the Golden Age arc, covering twelve volumes (and part of the thirteenth volume) of the manga. Its 25 episodes were broadcast in Japan on Nippon TV from October 8, 1997, to April 1, 1998. (Note: Berserk aired on Nippon TV on Tuesday midnight, effectively Wednesday at 1:45 a.m. JST.) VAP collected the episodes on VHS, with 13 sets released from February 1, 1998, to January 21, 1999. The series was later released on seven DVDs, from April 23 to October 22, 2003. VAP released the series on a Blu-ray box set on January 18, 2012.

In North America, it was originally reported that Urban Vision was negotiating the license to series for English release; however, it was then confirmed that Berserk was licensed by Media Blasters. The English dub was produced by NYAV Post. Around 2002, there were plans to air the series on the Sci-Fi Channel; however, Media Blasters warned them that the violence would have required too many cuts. Media Blasters released the series on VHS and six DVDs, under its Anime Works label, from May 28, 2002, to May 27, 2003. A complete DVD collection was released on November 16, 2004, and a remastered edition was released on March 10, 2009. In December 2012, Media Blasters announced that the rights to the series had expired. In January 2024, Discotek Media announced that it had licensed the series, and released it on a Blu-ray set on March 26 of the same year.

In the United Kingdom, Berserk was licensed by MVM Films. The six DVDs were released from September 3, 2007, to July 7, 2008. MVM re-released the series' complete DVD collection on October 11, 2010, and the Blu-ray collection on February 6, 2017. In Australia and New Zealand, Madman Entertainment released the six DVDs between December 2, 2002, and June 18, 2003. The complete DVD collection was released on March 17, 2004, and the Blu-ray collection on February 21, 2018.

== Soundtrack ==
Kenpū Denki Berserk: Original Soundtrack

Soundtrack album by Susumu Hirasawa
- Released: November 6, 1997
- Length: 34:13
- Label: VAP
- Producers: Mitsuru Ōshima; Azuma Urata; Kinya Yokoegawa & Shigetarō Hara (exec.)

Singles from Kenpū Denki Berserk – Original Soundtrack
- 1. "Berserk: Forces" Released: November 1, 1997; 2. "Tell Me Why" Released: November 6, 1997; 3. "Waiting So Long" Released: November 6, 1997

Susumu Hirasawa composed the music for Berserk. Penpals performed the opening theme "Tell Me Why" and Silver Fins performed the ending theme "Waiting So Long". "Berserk: Forces" was released as a single by Nippon Columbia (Teslakite) on November 1, 1997; "Tell Me Why" and "Waiting So Long" were released by VAP on November 6, 1997.

Kenpū Denki Berserk: Original Soundtrack (剣風伝奇ベルセルク オリジナル・サウンドトラッック, Kenpū Denki Beruseruku Orijinaru Saundotorakku) was released by VAP on November 6, 1997.

=== Track listing ===
All tracks written and performed by Susumu Hirasawa, except where noted.

No.	Title	Writer(s)	Length
1.	"Behelit"		1:55
2.	"Ghosts"		1:41
3.	"Ball"		1:08
4.	"Guts"		3:35
5.	"Murder"	Hirasawa; Sacol Trakranprasirt; Supat Kuntatun	9:29
6.	"Fear"		3:26
7.	"Monster"		4:03
8.	"Earth"		4:23
9.	"Berserk: Forces" (TV Version)		1:56
10.	"Tell Me Why" (TV Version) (performed by Penpals)	Hayashi Munemasa; Moriya Kamijō; Kinya Kamijō	1:15
11.	"Waiting So Long" (TV Version) (performed by Silver Fins)	Hitomi Takenaka; Mitsuhiro Asakura	1:22
Total length:			34:13

== Other media ==
Berserk: Kenpū Denki – Kanzen Kaiseki-sho (ベルセルク 剣風伝奇完全解析書, Beruseruku Kenpū Denki Kanzen Kaiseki-sho; 'Sword-Wind Chronicle Berserk – Complete Analysis Report'), an art book about the series, was released by Hakusensha on December 9, 1998.

== Reception ==
Berserk has received widespread critical acclaim and has frequently been listed as one of the best anime series of all time. Carlo Ross of THEM Anime Reviews initially found the series' tone overly bleak but later praised its character development, noting that the cast transcended typical fantasy archetypes with their nuanced portrayals. He likened the show's violence to the works of Akira Kurosawa, emphasizing its underlying humanity, and concluded that Berserk demanded intellectual engagement rather than passive viewing. Brittany Vincent of Anime News Network (ANN) commended the series' atmospheric storytelling despite its abrupt ending and occasional animation inconsistencies. She observed that the absence of certain characters, such as Puck, heightened the narrative's grim tone, while the pacing alternated between rapid and deliberate. Sandra Scholes of Active Anime described Berserk as a "hitting hack and slash demonically possessed horror fantasy of relentless proportions".

John Oppliger of AnimeNation highlighted Berserk's balance of visceral action and intricate storytelling, praising its unpredictability. Rob Ghoul of PopCultureShock initially dismissed the series as generic, but later lauded its compelling narrative. Eric Frederiksen of Advanced Media Network noted that Berserk's depth elevated it beyond mere spectacle, with its themes and characters leaving a lasting impact. Chris Beveridge of AnimeOnDVD praised the series' unflinching portrayal of violence within a meaningful narrative. Zac Bertschy of SciFi.com called Berserk one of the most mature and intellectually engaging fantasy series, exploring themes like child abuse and schizophrenia. In an ANN review, he further described it as the pinnacle of dark fantasy, retaining its impact years after release.

Mike Toole of Anime Jump deemed Berserk a standout in action-fantasy, praising its complex plot and visceral battles. In an ANN retrospective, he acknowledged its dated animation, but noted that its 2D presentation aged better than later CGI adaptations. Serdar Yegulalp of About.com called Berserk a grim yet masterful fantasy, surpassing even Lord of the Rings in intensity. He later noted that, like Game of Thrones, its appeal extended beyond traditional fantasy fans.

The soundtrack, composed by Susumu Hirasawa, received mixed but largely positive reviews. Ross criticized the opening and ending themes but praised tracks like "Forces" for their unconventional synth work. Bertschy commended its haunting versatility, while Yegulalp highlighted "Guts" for its emotional depth. Kathleen Townsend of Funimation similarly lauded the track's melancholic beauty. Toole found the score intense but repetitive, though he later acknowledged "Forces" as iconic. Frederiksen likened the music's ethereal quality to 1980s fantasy films.
