= Guts (Berserk) =

Fictional character from Berserk

- Berserk character
- Guts, as illustrated by Kentaro Miura
- First appearance: Berserk chapter A0: "The Black Swordsman" (1989)
- Created by: Kentaro Miura
- Voiced by: Japanese: Nobutoshi Canna (1997 anime); Hiroaki Iwanaga (films, 2016 anime); English: Marc Diraison (1997 anime, films); Kaiji Tang (2016 anime); Michael Bell (Sword of the Berserk)

Guts (Japanese: ガッツ, Hepburn: Gattsu) is a fictional character and the protagonist of the manga series Berserk, created by Kentaro Miura. Guts is a mercenary who travels from company to company and companionship to companionship. After meeting Griffith, Guts is defeated in battle by Griffith and is forced to join the Band of the Hawk as the latter proclaims he now "owns" him. The dynamic and turbulent relationship between Guts and Griffith, the leader of the Band of the Hawk, forms the primary focus of the manga. After the events of the Eclipse, during which he loses his left forearm and right eye, Guts seeks revenge on Griffith. Throughout his journey, he becomes known as the Black Swordsman (黒い剣士, Kuroi Kenshi).

The character has also appeared in the animated adaptations of Berserk as well as video games with multiple voice actors. Miura conceptualized Guts' character while he was an assistant to George Morikawa. He mentioned multiple influences including Kenshiro from Fist of the North Star, Conan the Barbarian, Dororo, and Mad Max, among others.

Critical response to Guts has been highly positive. Guts has been praised for the themes he embodies as a result of his tragic backstory and how he becomes an anti-hero in the process, to the point of being one of the most iconic characters in manga and anime.

== Creation and design ==
While briefly working as an assistant to George Morikawa at 18, Kentaro Miura had already planned some ideas for Berserk's development, having a dark warrior with a gigantic sword illustrated in his portfolio who would later become the first conception of Guts.

Miura stated that the inspiration for the series' title was diffuse at the time of creation. He did not have information about the berserkers or the Berserker Armor (which first appeared in the 222nd chapter) planned out from the start. He chose the word, telling himself that "its mysterious aspect would stick well". Miura said that the title was connected to Guts's imagery, influenced by Mad Max's eponymous character, further elaborating: "In short, starting from a world with a dark hero who is burning for revenge, prompts you to imagine a rabid character. When, guided by his anger, he will pour out this rage on overpowered enemies, we must insist on his fanaticism if you want to stay consistent. That's why I thought "Berserk" would make a perfect title to represent my universe".

=== Characterization and influences ===
Some aspects of Guts (personality and design) were partially inspired by Miura's high school friend and later fellow manga artist Kouji Mori, by Mad Max, and by Rutger Hauer's performances in Flesh and Blood, Blade Runner, The Hitcher and The Blood of Heroes. Guts' prosthetic hand was inspired by Dororo's Hyakkimaru and Cobra's eponymous protagonist. Kurt, the protagonist of Pygmalio, by Shinji Wada, and an illustration of a giant wielding a sword, featured in The Snow Queen (a Guin Saga spin-off), inspired the size of Guts' sword, the Dragon Slayer, by mixing both characters' swords.

Guts' Berserker Armor was derived from shōnen manga trends.

Miura commented that when drawing the Dragon Slayer, he wanted to emulate the effect of Kenshiro's or Raoh's (Fist of the North Star) fist "flying out from the page", but he felt that Guts' sword did not have the same feeling of weight as a fist. He wanted to convey an "extension of reality" feel to the sword, similar to the depiction of the Fist of the North Star's Hokuto Shinken martial art, and make it believable for the readers. Miura stated that "Black Swordsman" Guts was the first thing he was set on, but he did not have any idea about what his backstory would be. He focused on the character development up until around the third or fourth volume and then he would think about what brought him to revenge. Miura also said that the story of the fight between Guts and Griffith speaks about their change after having built their personalities. Miura stated that he based the Band of the Hawk on his own high school friend relationship experience. Specifically, he mentioned that his friendship with later fellow manga artist Koji Mori partially inspired the Guts and Griffith's relationship.

In regard to his design, Miura did not conceive the idea of giving Guts armor to protect him during battles before the series' publication. Miura claimed everything was in place for this element to be obvious. The manga author found this arrival of power-ups to use against overpowered antagonists to be more common in shōnen manga than seinen manga. Originally, Miura aimed for Guts to solve all of his issues with physical strength until the manga took a more magical setting. He then came up with the idea of the Berserker Armor, an armor that gives the user immense physical strength at the cost of driving them crazy. Miura felt this was perfect for the series and that it gives more meaning to its title of "Berserk".

=== Casting ===
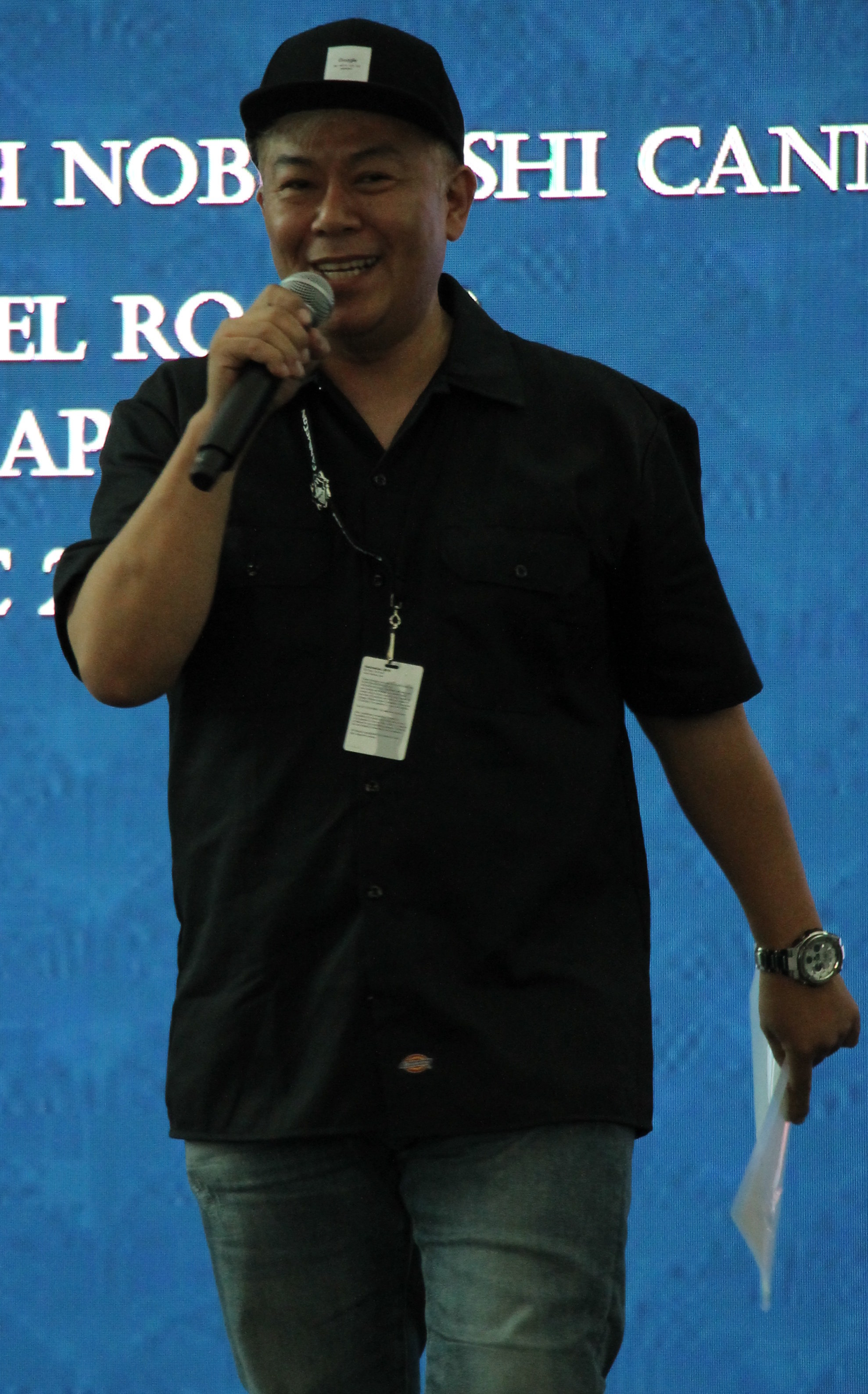
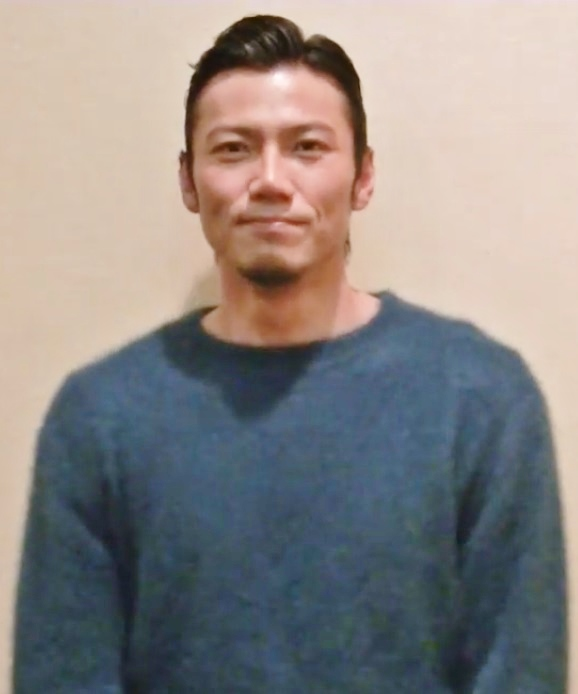
Nobutoshi Canna (left) and Hiroaki Iwanaga (right), the actors who voiced Guts in Japanese

The character of Guts was voiced by Nobutoshi Canna in Japanese for the 1997 anime; Hiroaki Iwanaga replaced him for the Japanese movies, the 2016 anime and Berserk and the Band of the Hawk. For English, Marc Diraison voiced him in the 1997 anime and movies; Kaiji Tang voiced him in the 2016 anime; and Michael Bell voiced him in Sword of the Berserk: Guts' Rage.

== Appearances ==
=== Berserk manga ===
Guts is a lone swordsman who saves a tormented elf named Puck and a red-haired youth. Raised by his adoptive father and mentor Gambino, the young Guts was forced to kill Gambino when the man attempted to murder him in misplaced blame for his wife's death for saving his life when born from his hanged mother. A few years later, an older Guts attracts the attention of a mercenary group, The Band of the Hawk, when he kills the knight Bazuso during a siege. Corkus attempts to rob Guts before he is saved by the Hawks' female captain Casca, who is in turn saved by their leader Griffith as he grievously wounds Guts. When Guts recovers, he is forced into joining the Band of the Hawk when Griffith defeats him in a duel and later learns of the Beherit pendant Griffith possesses. Three years pass and the Band of the Hawk grows in power and numbers as they are employed by the Kingdom of Midland for its Hundred-Year War against the Tudor Empire, and Griffith rises in the kingdom's hierarchy after a successful battle. During a siege, Guts and Griffith encounter the Apostle Nosferatu Zodd, a fearsome immortal warrior who nearly kills them before noticing Griffith's Beherit. Zodd takes his leave while warning Guts that Griffith will be his doom once the latter's dream crumbles while still considering him a friend.

Later, the Band of the Hawk participates in the battle to capture the impenetrable Fortress of Doldrey and end the Hundred Years' War, wherein Casca kills Adon. A month after the war's end, Guts parts ways with Griffith after defeating him in a duel. A year after Guts departs from the Band of the Hawk, he returns to aid them in freeing Griffith from the Tower of Rebirth. Griffith agrees to sacrifice his allies in exchange for being reborn as Femto, a member of the God Hand. The Band of the Hawk is slaughtered by the God Hand's monstrous Apostles (former humans like Nosferatu Zodd) and Femto rapes Casca. Guts loses his left arm and right eye trying to save Casca, but Casca loses her sanity from the nightmarish ordeal. Guts and Casca are spirited back to their world by the mysterious Skull Knight, who tells Guts he has been branded by the God Hand and will be subjected to nightly attacks by evil creatures. Guts leaves Casca under the care of former comrade Rickert and embarks on a journey to hunt down Apostles and the God Hand.

Guts decides to travel with Casca to Puck's homeland of Elfhelm on the island of Skellig, allowing Isidro, Farnese, and Serpico to follow him out of fear that he will lose control of himself to his dark impulses, which are embodied as the Beast of Darkness within his mind, with Farnese becoming Casca's primary caretaker. Guts' party encounters the witch Flora, her apprentice Schierke and the elf Ivalera while saving a village from trolls, and Flora gives him the Berserker Armor, which increases his power but risks pushing his body beyond its limits and being consumed by his inner darkness. Skull Knight warns Guts to not abuse the Berserker Armor's power while assuring him that Elfhelm's inhabitants can heal Casca's mind. The Skull Knight introduces Guts to the creator of the Berserker Armor and reveals his past with the Godhand and its leader, Void. The Moonlight Child later reappears; it is revealed that he is the Demon Child, who can take control of Griffith's host during a full moon.

The Kushan escort Guts and the rest of the party to their capital where Guts is imprisoned as a precaution. Daiba informs them that Falconia's army has appeared on the borders of the Kushan Empire and that the attack on Elfhelm is part of a wider campaign by Falconia to have Griffith rule the world. Daiba, therefore, orders that Guts and his party, Rodrick, the ships' crew, and Elfhelm's surviving sorcerers be placed under his command as the empire prepares for war with Falconia. As they adjust to life in the Kushan capital, Schierke remains unconscious and Guts remains imprisoned; Rodrick attends the kurultai, a meeting of the ruling Kushan clans called by the new emperor as a guest, alongside Silat and Daiba. There, Daiba informs the emperor of his experiences in Falconia; Silat asks the emperor to lead the army against Griffith. This is interrupted when Rakshas, a Kushan Apostle in the New Band of the Hawk, appears from the body of a Kushan lord. Seeking darkness, Rakshas finds Guts in his cell who willingly accepts death before Silat catches up and kills Rakshas. While the city reels from the attack, it is revealed that Schierke is using astral projection to scout out Falconia in search of Casca.

=== Other appearances ===
Guts is a playable character in the video games Sword of the Berserk: Guts' Rage and Berserk: Millennium Falcon Hen Seima Senki no Shō which adapt Guts' role in the manga.

Berserk and the Band of the Hawk also feature the main character as a playable one. Guts is a guest character in the video game Shin Megami Tensei: Liberation Dx2.

== Reception ==
=== Critical response ===
Topics focused on Guts involve friendship, camaraderie and human relations. As a child, Guts tries to build some level of friendship with his mercenary group, but due to his traumatic experience with them, he lost trust in people. However, through the time he is with Griffith and the rest of the Band of the Hawk, Guts forms bonds, friendships, animosities and co-dependencies, maturing as well as an individual. Jacob Chapman of Anime News Network, wrote that through their friendship, Guts' ambitions were elevated and Griffith's were lowered, allowing both of them to consider a new future for the first time, one where they fight side-by-side as equals and die on the battlefield, but they reject this future out of their own personal fears, as Guts did not think he was "good enough" for a happy future and Griffith was terrified of his lofty dream crumbling into something more mundane. When Guts comes running to rescue him during the Eclipse, Griffith reaches his moment of anagnorisis, with his thought: "You're the only one ... who made me forget my dream".

Reviewing the first two volumes, Greg McElhatton of Read About Comics wrote: "it's still hard to identify what about Berserk brings across such a fascination. Is it the characters? The visual look of the monsters? The little hints of a troubled past, like Guts's tattoo that oozes blood? All of the above? I'm not sure, but I do know that I'm hooked." Chetri called Miura a "splendid storyteller whose artwork is stark and bold enough to bring the world of Guts to life magnificently."

=== Legacy ===
Cosplay of Guts at Desucon, 2013

Ramsey Isler of IGN stated that Guts "served as a template for many heroes that came after him", adding that the "ridiculously big sword he wields" started a trend, spread to characters like Cloud Strife from Final Fantasy VII and Ichigo Kurosaki from Bleach. Video game director Hideaki Itsuno and producer Hiroyuki Kobayashi are fans of Berserk, and the role-playing hack and slash game Dragon's Dogma includes armor based on Guts and Griffith's. Yoko Taro stated that the protagonist of the first Drakengard game, Caim, was inspired by Guts. The character's role in the animated adaptations has also been praised. According to AnimeNation "the viewer wants to know what happened to make Guts appear as he does in the first episode". Carlo Ross of THEM Anime Reviews stated that Guts comes across as more interesting protagonist when portrayed alongside Griffith whose betrayal leaves a major impact in understanding of Guts' silent and dark personality. Anime News Network agreed, stating that Guts comes across as a tragic humanized individual when his past is explored. Guts' quest for vengeance was commented by IGN to be properly done. Kaiji Tang's work as Guts' voice actor was well received by Anime News Network for providing "a wonderfully deep, gravel-voiced interpretation" of the character.

=== Analysis ===
Betrayal and revenge are major themes in the series. Guts suffered his first betrayal when Gambino sold Guts' body to another soldier for a few coins. Guts is on a quest for revenge after his comrades were betrayed by Griffith and sacrificed by the God Hand. This desire for vengeance has been his main reason for survival. Guts' characterization has been the subject of studies. According to SyFy, Guts struggles with destiny itself and is constantly resisting the pull of predetermination. Critics noted that Guts, at the beginning of the story, is presented as an antihero who does not care about killing and is indifferent to people who aid him. Guts does not act in accordance with definitions of right and wrong; he operates within a gray area and does not attempt to be heroic or protect the innocent. However, as the story progresses, it is shown that he is in fact a person who is deeply conflicted internally, giving him notable depths. His tragic and traumatic past, unfolded in the Golden Age arc, proves that Guts is a much more complex character according to Mania, The Fandom Post, and Anime News Network.

In "Campeones Solitarios en la Viñeta Japonesa" multiple writers compared Guts with other protagonists from the seinen manga demography aimed towards adults with Thorfinn from Vinland Saga, and Miyamoto Musashi from Vagabond as the three leading characters had their childhood defined by violence and how across maturity, the three seek a way to reject violence and obtain healthier lives; Both Thorfinn and Guts are initially written in notable antagonistic fashion to the readers themselves, embodying the concept of a harsh masculinity born from rage. Both Thorfinn and Guts are victimized after tragic stories with Guts being victimized by the chaos caused by Griffith. A major part of each protagonist's growth is obtaining a more mature morality which is common in Japanese culture and thus they seek redemption with Guts becoming friendlier and more heroic in his quest to save Casca.
