= Marc Diraison =

American voice actor

- Occupations: Voice actor; ADR director; script writer
- Years active: 1982–present

Marc Diraison is an American voice actor, ADR director and script writer who has worked for Bang Zoom! Entertainment, NYAV Post, 4Kids Entertainment and DuArt Film and Video. He is best known as the English voice of Guts in Berserk animated adaptations, specifically the 1997 anime adaptation and the 2012 movie trilogy. He has also portrayed Akihiko Kayaba in Sword Art Online and Tokiomi Tohsaka in Fate/Zero.

== Filmography ==
=== Anime ===
List of voice performances and production work in anime television series and OVAs
Year	Title	Role	Notes	Ref.
2001	Knight Hunters: Weiß Kreuz	Yoji Kudo	Second voice	
2002–03	Berserk	Guts		
2003	Samurai Deeper Kyo	Saizo Kirigakure		
2003	Space Pirate Mito	Karsoon		
2003	Sadamitsu the Destroyer	Vice Principal		
2004	ShootFighter Tekken	Yoshiki Takaishi	OVA	
2004	Giant Robo	Kenji Murasame	OVA, NYAV Post dub	
2004	Domain of Murder	Kyusaku Kogure	OVA	
2004	Gokusen	Goro Sawatari		
2004–07	One Piece	Roronoa Zoro	4Kids Entertainment dub	
2004	Shura no Toki: Age of Chaos	Ryoma Sakamoto		
2004	F-Zero: Falcon Densetsu	Antonio Guster, Young Silver Neelson		
2004	Shrine of the Morning Mist	Michimune Ayatachi, Masashi Kusugi		
2005	Shadow Star Narutaru	Ono	Episode 5	
2005	Gin Rei	Kenji Murasame	ADR voice director, OVA	
2005	Ah! My Goddess	Toshiyuki Aoshima	ADR voice director	
2005	Midori Days	Masami Kyomoto		
2005	Piano: The Melody of a Young Girl's Heart	Shirakawa		
2005	Sonic X	Pale Bayleaf		
2005	Yu-Gi-Oh! Duel Monsters	Young Solomon Muto	Episode 199	
2006	Yu-Gi-Oh! GX	Chancellor Frost	Episode 24	
2006	Pokémon	Tyson		
2006	GaoGaiGar: The King of Braves	Leo Shishioh		
2006	Ninja Nonsense		ADR voice director	
2007	Ah! My Goddess: Flights of Fancy	Toshiyuki Aoshima	ADR voice director	
2007	Phoenix	Uraji		
2008	Freedom	David	OVA	
2008	Dinosaur King	Gabbro		
2008–10	Yu-Gi-Oh! 5Ds	Kalin Kessler		
2009	Kurokami: The Animation	Hiyō, Additional Voices	ADR voice director (with Michael Sinterniklaas); ADR script writer (with Jay Snyder)	
2009	Let's Go Tamagotchi!	Bikertchi, Sunnytchi	ADR voice director (with Michael Sinterniklaas); ADR script writer	
2010	Pokémon	Riley, Clayton, Ingo		
2010–14	Mobile Suit Gundam Unicorn	Meran	Production staff, OVAs	
2011	Bakuman	Nobuhiro Mashiro, Kim Song-Yu		
2013	Lagrange: The Flower of Rin-ne	Captain		
2013	Fate/Zero	Tokiomi Tohsaka		
2013	Zetman	Sweeper, Takayuki Hige, Narrator	ADR script writer	
2013	Nura: Rise of the Yokai Clan - Demon Capital	Kidomaru		
2013–19	Sword Art Online	Akihiko Kayaba		
2013–14	Magi: The Labyrinth of Magic	Ithnan, Cassim's Father		
2014	Gargantia on the Verdurous Planet	Kugel		
2014	Coppelion	Gojiro Kajii, Heiji Tanizaki		
2015	Magi: The Kingdom of Magic	Ithnan		
2015	Aldnoah.Zero	Wolf Areash		
2015	JoJo's Bizarre Adventure	George Joestar I, others		
2015	The Seven Deadly Sins	Ruin		
2015, 2019	Mobile Suit Gundam: The Origin	Zeon Zum Deikun	OVAs and TV	
2016	Mobile Suit Gundam: Iron-Blooded Orphans	Iznario Fareed		
2016	One-Punch Man	Bearded Worker, Pig God, Subterranean 4	Subterranean in Episode 1, Pig God in Episode 10	
2017–19	Hunter × Hunter	Ging Freecss	2011 series	
2018–19	Beyblade Burst Turbo	Taiga Akabane		
2018	Re:Zero − Starting Life in Another World	Wilhelm van Astrea		
2023	Berserk: Memorial Edition	Guts		

=== Animation ===
List of voice performances and production work in animation
Year	Title	Role	Crew Role, Notes	Ref.
2004–09	Teenage Mutant Ninja Turtles	Silver Sentry, Raptarr, Ruffington, Turtle Titan II		
2005–07	Winx Club	Helia	4Kids version	
2006	Kappa Mikey	Dr. Igor	Episode: "Big Trouble in Little Tokyo"	
2007–09	Chaotic	Codemaster Crellan		
2008–09	Three Delivery		Voice director (with Michael Sinterniklaas)	
2009–12	Huntik: Secrets & Seekers	Rassimov (Season 2), Clements, Suit Member	Voice director (with Michael Sinterniklaas (season 1) and Stephanie Sheh)	
2018	Treehouse Detectives	Moose, Great Horned Owl, Commodore Barry, Lucille's Dad		
2021	The JayShow Movie	Oyaji Robo-sama		

=== Films ===
List of voice performances and production work in direct-to-video, television films and feature films
Year	Title	Role	Notes	Ref.
2003	The Weathering Continent	Bois		
2010	Animals United	Cook, the Reporter		
2012	Berserk: The Golden Age Arc I - The Egg of the King	Guts	Production coordinator	
2013	Berserk: The Golden Age Arc II - The Battle for Doldrey	Guts		
2014	Berserk: The Golden Age Arc III - The Advent	Guts		
2014	Welcome to the Space Show	Pochi Rickman	ADR voice director (with Stephanie Sheh)	
2014	Patema Inverted	Teacher	ADR script writer	
2015	009 Re:Cyborg	Cyborg 002/JetLink		
2016	Miss Hokusai	Hatsugoro/Totoya Hokkei		
2016	Your Name	Taki's Father		
2017	A Silent Voice	Mr. Takeuchi		
2017	Sword Art Online The Movie: Ordinal Scale	Akihiko Kayaba	Reprisal	
2017	Birdboy: The Forgotten Children	Mouse Father		

=== Video games ===
List of voice performances in video games
Year	Title	Role	Notes	Ref.
2006	One Piece: Pirates' Carnival	Roronoa Zoro		
2017	Yu-Gi-Oh! Duel Links	Kalin Kassler	Reprisal	
2017	Fire Emblem Heroes	Conrad	Reprisal	
2017	Fire Emblem Echoes: Shadows of Valentia	Conrad		
2019	Shenmue III	Hong Dejing		
