= Nobutoshi Canna =

Japanese actor (born 1968)

- 神奈 延年
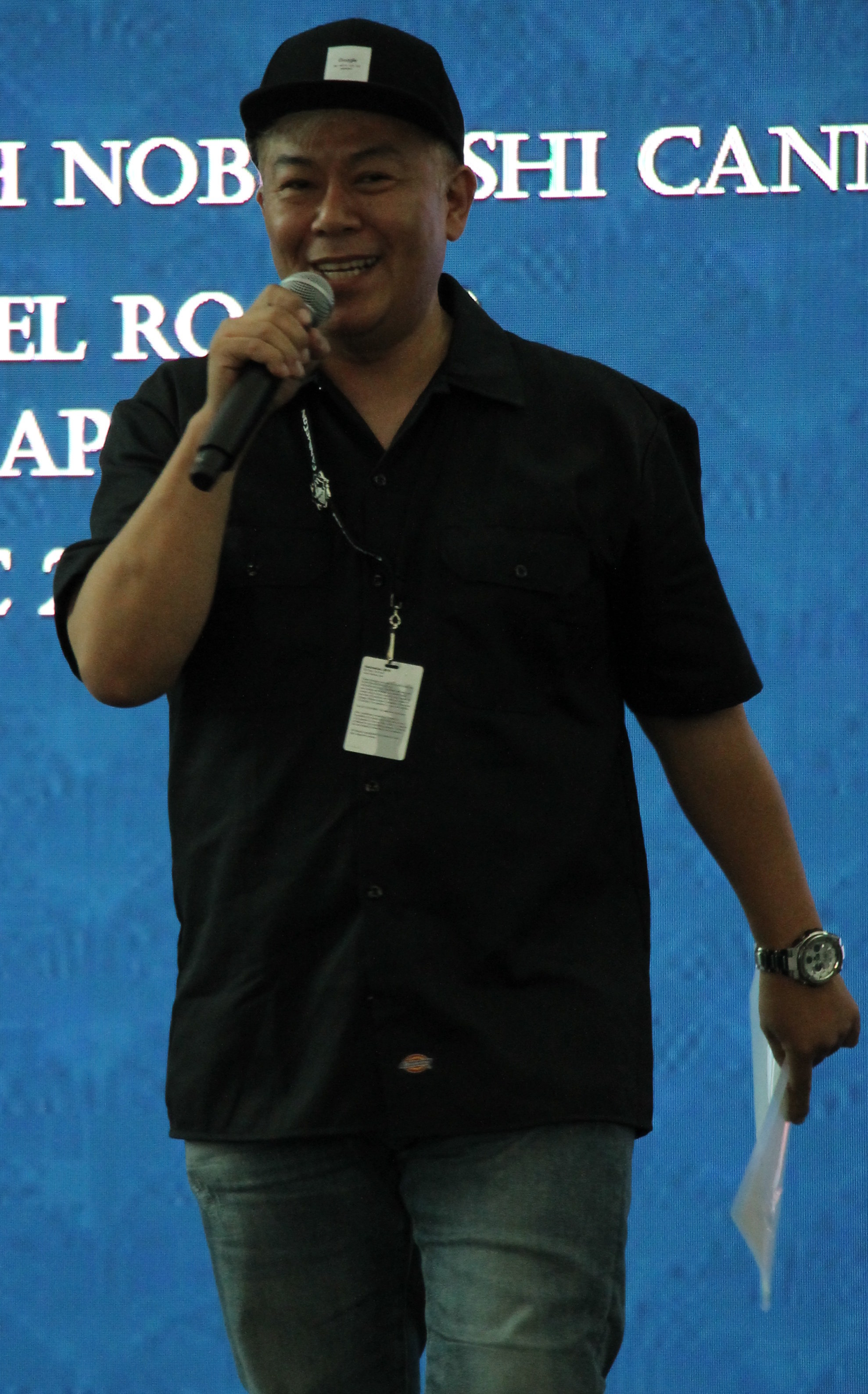
- Canna in 2019
- Born: Nobutoshi Hayashi; June 10, 1968 (age 58); Shinagawa, Tokyo, Japan
- Occupations: Actor; voice actor; singer; narrator
- Years active: 1971–present
- Agent: Aoni Production
- Height: 170 cm (5 ft 7 in)

Nobutoshi Hayashi (林 延年, Hayashi Nobutoshi; born June 10, 1968 in Shinagawa, Tokyo), better known by the stage name Nobutoshi Canna (神奈 延年, Kanna Nobutoshi), is a Japanese actor, voice actor, singer and narrator who is affiliated with Aoni Production. He first started acting as a child. Canna is best known for his performances as Tasuki in Fushigi Yûgi, Ban Mido in GetBackers, Nnoitra Gilga in Bleach, Lancer in the Fate franchise, Basara Nekki in Macross 7, Kabuto Yakushi in Naruto, Cao Pi in the Dynasty Warriors and Warriors Orochi series, Kai Kogashiwa in the Initial D anime and the Initial D Arcade Stage series from Arcade Stage 4 to Arcade Stage 8 infinity, Guts in Berserk, Knuckles the Echidna in the Sonic the Hedgehog franchise since 1998, Lee Pai-Long in Shaman King, Brian Stelbart in Feda: The Emblem of Justice, and Nowaki Kusama in Junjo Romantica: Pure Romance.

== Filmography ==
=== Anime ===
Year	Title	Role	Notes	Sources
1991	Future GPX Cyber Formula	Makoto Katagiri; Leon Earnhardt		
1991	Kikou Keisatsu Metal Jack	Ken Kanzaki		
1991	Dragon Quest	Prince Frank	Debut	
1992	Kiteretsu Daihyakka	Nojima		
1992	Mama wa Shougaku Yonensei	Enemy		
1992	Kinnikuman: Kinnikusei Ōi Sōdatsu-hen	Geronimo		
1992	The Brave Fighter of Legend Da-Garn	Hawk Saber; Pegasus Saber		
1992	Crayon Shin-chan	Voice; Lunch Shop TV; Royan Soup		
1992	Super Bikkuriman	Crystal Tenshi; Black Night		
1992	Thumbelina: A Magical Story	Prince of Shadows		
1993	Wakakusa Monogatari Nan to Jou Sensei	Dan Keen		
1993	Nintama Rantaro	Dumpling Shop; Koheia Nanamatsu		
1993	Fatal Fury 2: The New Battle	Hopper		
1993	Muka Muka Paradise	General Kayama		
1993	Heisei Inu Monogatari Bow	AD; Bank Robber; Pheasant; Attendant		
1993	Jungle no Ouja Taa-chan	Michael Kogan		
1993	Slam Dunk	Tetsushi Shiozaki; Kentarou Ishii; Yuji Okusu; Ichiro Kanso; Hiroshi Takatsu; Mitsuru Nagano		
1993	Dragon Ball Z	Robber C; Rubbernecker A; Young Man		
1993	Aoki Densetsu Shoot!	Kenji Shiraishi		
1994	Brave Police J-Decker	Kohei		
1994	Chō Kuseninarisou	Akira Nosaka		
1994	Macross 7	Basara Nekki		
1994	Captain Tsubasa J	Takashi Sugimoto (Koji Yoshikawa); Tadashi Shiroyama		
1995	Azuki-chan	Katsuya Tojo		
1995	Fushigi Yûgi	Tasuki		
1996	Detective Conan	Jinpei Matsuda		
1996	Brave Command Dagwon	Alien Kirado		
1996	After War Gundam X	Pernod		
1996	Those Who Hunt Elves	Yurii		
1997	Kindaichi Shounen no Jikenbo	Ryūnosuke Tatsumi; Takeshi Jinma		
1997	Cooking Master Boy	Leon		
1997	Hare Tokidoki Buta	Kurobuta		
1997	Chō Mashin Eiyūden Wataru	Donarukami Doran		
1997	Berserk	Guts		
1997	Fortune Quest L	Yuriano		
1998	Bomberman B-Daman Bakugaiden V	Jack; Dark Prince		
1998	Record of Lodoss War: Chronicles of the Heroic Knight	Paan		
1998	DT Eightron	Rosso		
1998	Jikū Tantei Genshi-kun	Damon		
1998	Gasaraki	Takuro Suemi		
1998	Generator Gawl	Gawl Kudo		
1999	Gokudō-kun Man'yūki	Backer		
1999	I'm Gonna Be An Angel	Gabriel		
1999	Colorful	Hirokawa		
1999	Jibaku-kun	Boyle		
1999	Weekly Story Land	Tetsuya; Chuhachi; Takaoka Ryuji; Koichi Asai; Kensuke Miyamoto; Nonomura; Kazuyuki Takagi		
2000	Hand Maid May	Yamazaki		
2000	Fighting Spirit	Yusuke Oda		
2000	Gambler Densetsu Tetsuya	Tobi		
2000	Inuyasha	Hiten		
2001	Project ARMS	Ryo Takatsuki		
2001	Galaxy Angel	Green		
2001	Offside	Yoshihiko Hibino		
2001	Shaman King	Lee Pai-Long		
2001	Final Fantasy: Unlimited	Wind		
2001	Kasumin	Jiro Yuki		
2001	Rave Master	Jegan		
2001	Cyborg 009: The Cyborg Soldier	Jean		
2002	Daigunder	Taigamaru; Drago Freezer		
2002	Tokyo Mew Mew	Pie		
2002	Mahoromatic: Something More Beautiful	Yu Misato		
2002	Naruto	Kabuto Yakushi		
2002	GetBackers	Ban Mido		
2003	Bōken Yūki Pluster World	Zagarian		
2003	Konjiki no Gash Bell!!	Genso		
2003	Planetes	Leonov Norushutin		
2003–2004	Sonic X	Knuckles the Echidna		
2004	Transformers: Superlink	Inferno; Sixshot		
2004	Sgt. Frog	Sato		
2004	Samurai Champloo	Kinugasa		
2004	Kurau: Phantom Memory	Dog		
2004	Uta∽Kata	Kai Todo		
2004	Tactics	Seiichi		
2004	Yu-Gi-Oh! Duel Monsters GX	Kagemaru		
2004	Meine Liebe	Torugura		
2004	Beast Machines: Transformers	Nightscream		
2005	AIR	Ryūya		
2005	Kaiketsu Zorori	Kachina		
2005	Angel Heart	Yuji Fukudome		
2005	Black Cat	River Zasutori		
2006	Fate/Stay Night	Lancer/Cú Chulainn		
2006	Inukami!	Daiyoko		
2006	The Story of Saiunkoku	Yūshun Tei		
2006	Koi suru Tenshi Angelique ~ Kokoro no Mezameru Toki ~	Randy		
2006	Shonen Onmyouji	Nonarichika Abe		
2006	009-1	Norman		
2006	Ryusei no Rockman	Cygnus		
2007–2016	Naruto: Shippuden	Kabuto Yakushi		
2007	Bleach	Nnoitra Gilga		
2007	The Story of Saiunkoku	Yūshun Tei		
2007	ZOMBIE-LOAN	Yurii		
2007	Baccano!	Ronnie Sukiato		
2007	Hatarakids My Ham Gumi	Rameda		
2008	Itazura na Kiss	Keita Kamogari		
2008	Soul Eater	Giriko		
2008	Junjō Romantica	Nowaki Kusama		
2008	Corpse Princess	Honda		
2008	Hell Girl: Three Vessels	Yukihiko Kikuchi		
2008	Junjō Romantica 2	Nowaki Kusama		
2009	Shikabane Hime: Kuro	Honda		
2010	Giant Killing	Mochida		
2010	Super Robot Wars Original Generation: The Inspector	Axel Almer		
2011	Digimon Xros Wars	Examon		
2011	Phi-Brain: Puzzle of God	Crash		
2011	Guilty Crown	Makoto Waltz		
2012	Smile Precure!	Genji Midorikawa		
2012	Saint Seiya Omega	Argo		
2012	Ginga e Kickoff!!	Money		
2012	Rock Lee no Seishun Full Power Ninden	Kabuto Yakushi		
2012	Campione!	Perseus		
2012	Little Busters!	Masato Inohara		
2012	Initial D: Fifth Stage	Kai Kogashiwa		
2013	Gundam Build Fighters	Rainer Cziommer		
2014	Fate/stay night: Unlimited Blade Works	Lancer/Cú Chulainn		
2014	Gonna be the Twin-Tail!!	Snail Guildy		
2015	Fate/stay night: Unlimited Blade Works Season 2	Lancer/Cú Chulainn		
2015	Saint Seiya: Soul of Gold	Aquarius Camus		
2016	Haven't You Heard? I'm Sakamoto	Ryou		
2016	Kagewani Sho	Dr.Kai, Passerby, Researcher, Tribal soldier		
2017	Boruto: Naruto Next Generations	Kabuto Yakushi		
2017	Dragon Ball Super	Saonel		
2018	Today's Menu for the Emiya Family	Lancer/Cú Chulainn		
2019	The Price of Smiles	Harold Miller		
2020	Bofuri	Drag		
2021	Kaginado	Masato Inohara		
2021	Detective Conan: Police Academy Arc	Jinpei Matsuda		
2023	Am I Actually the Strongest?	Johnny		
2023	Ragna Crimson	Future Ragna		
2023	MF Ghost	Kai Kogashiwa		
2025	#Compass 2.0: Combat Providence Analysis System	Istaqa		

=== Movies ===
Year	Title	Role	Notes	Sources
1993	Dragon Ball Z: Broly – The Legendary Super Saiyan	Examiner		
1993	On a Paper Crane - Tomoko's Adventure	Newlyweds		
1994	Slam Dunk	Yuji Okusu		
1994	Slam Dunk: Zenkoku Seiha da! Sakuragi Hanamichi	Yuji Okusu		
1995	Slam Dunk: Shohoku Saidai no Kiki! Moero Sakuragi Hanamichi	Yuji Okusu		
1995	Slam Dunk: Hoero Basketman Tamashii! Hanamichi to Rukawa no Atsuki Natsu	Yuji Okusu		
1995	Macross 7 the Movie: The Galaxy's Calling Me!	Basara Nekki		
2001	Initial D: Third Stage	Kai Kogashiwa		
2001	Crayon Shin-chan: The Storm Called: The Adult Empire Strikes Back	Hero Sun		
2004	Detective Conan: Magician of the Silver Sky	Security Guard		
2004	Inuyasha the Movie: Fire on the Mystic Island	Ryūra		
2007	Detective Conan: Jolly Roger in the Deep Azure	Izusan Taro		
2008	Naruto the Movie: Legend of the Stone of Gelel	Kabuto Yakushi		
2010	Crayon Shin-chan: Super-Dimension! The Storm Called My Bride	Adult Shinnosuke/Shinchan		
2014	Persona 3 The Movie: No. 2, Midsummer Knight's Dream	Takaya Sakaki		
2017	Fate/stay night: Heaven's Feel I. presage flower	Lancer/Cú Chulainn		
2023	Gridman Universe	Mad Origin		
2024	Nintama Rantarō: Invincible Master of the Dokutake Ninja	Nanamatsu Koheita		

=== Games ===
Year	Title	Platform	Role	Notes	Sources
1993	Heritage of God Ruin		Gilmore		
1995	Kekkon ~Marriage~		Shou Nakamoto		
1996	Policenauts		Saito; Bob		
1996	Last Bronx		Red Eye/Ken Kono		
1996	Battle Arena Toshinden 3		Abel; Vail		
1996	Star Gladiator		Hayato Kanzaki		
1996	FEDA Remake!: The Emblem of Justice		Brian Stelbart		
1997	QUOVADIS		Benjamin Back		
1997	Marika ~Shinjitsu no Sekai~		Genichiro Kato		
1997	Bloody Roar		Yugo		
1998	Mitsumete Knight		Sail Nekuseraria		
1998	Radiant Silvergun		Gai		
1998	Sotsugyō M		Shou Nakamoto		
1998	Kamaitachi no Yoru		Yosuke Mikimoto		
1998–present	Sonic the Hedgehog series		Knuckles the Echidna		
1999	Soulcalibur		Maxi		
1999	Sword of the Berserk: Guts' Rage		Guts		
2001	Atelier Lilie ~The Alchemist of Salburg 3~				
2001	Summon Night 2		Reido; Reimu		
2001	Legaia 2: Duel Saga		Lang		
2001	Hermina and Culus ~Atelier Lilie Another Story~				
2001	Inuyasha		Hiten		
2002	Air				
2002	Initial D Arcade Stage Ver. 2		Kai Kogashiwa		
2003	Final Fantasy X-2		Nuji		
2003	Initial D Arcade Stage Ver. 3		Kai Kogashiwa		
2003	Soulcalibur 2		Maxi		
2003	Castlevania: Lament of Innocence		Leon Belmont		
2004	Airforce Delta Strike		Ken Thomas		
2004	Berserk: Millennium Falcon Hen Seima Senki no Shō		Guts		
2004	Shining Tears		Kaineru		
2004	Zatch Bell! Mamodo Fury		Genso		
2005	Dynasty Warriors 5		Cao Pi		
2005	Soulcalibur III		Maxi		
2006	Ar tonelico: Melody of Elemia		Jack Hamilton		
2006	JoJo's Bizarre Adventure: Phantom Blood		Bruford		
2006	Persona 3		Takaya Sakaki		
2006	Yu-Gi-Oh! Duel Monsters GX: Tag Force		Kagemaru		
2007	Warriors Orochi		Cao Pi		
2007	Fate/stay night Realta Nua		Lancer/Cú Chulainn		
2007	Little Busters!		Masato Inohara		
2007	Fate/tiger colosseum		Lancer		
2007	Dynasty Warriors 6		Cao Pi		
2007	Initial D Arcade Stage 4		Kai Kogashiwa		
2007	Super Robot Wars: Original Generations		Axel Almer		
2007	Super Robot Wars Original Generation Gaiden		Axel Almer		
2008	Phantasy Star 0		Kai		
2008	Super Robot Taisen A Portable		Axel Almer; Uchuuta Kamie		
2008	Warriors Orochi 2		Cao Pi		
2008	Fate/tiger colosseum Upper		Lancer/Cú Chulainn		
2008	Sands of Destruction		Rajifu		
2008	Macross Ace Frontier		Basara Nekki		
2008	Junjou Romantica 〜Koi no Dokidoki Dai Sakusen〜		Nowaki Kusama		
2008	Yu-Gi-Oh! Duel Monsters GX: Tag Force 3		Kagemaru		
2008	Fate/unlimited codes		Lancer/Cú Chulainn		
2009	Fate/unlimited codes PORTABLE		Lancer/Cú Chulainn		
2009	Macross Ultimate Frontier		Basara Nekki		
2009	Uncharted 2: Among Thieves		Harry Flynn	Japanese dub	
2009	Tokimeki Memorial 4		Ryohei Koga		
2009	Initial D Arcade Stage 5		Kai Kogashiwa		
2010	Ar tonelico Qoga: Knell of Ar Ciel		Jack Hamilton		
2010	Fist of the North Star: Ken's Rage		Souther		
2010	Fate/Extra		Lancer/Cú Chulainn		
2010	Kurohyō: Ryū ga Gotoku Shinshō		Reiji Shinjo		
2011	Macross Triangle Frontier		Basara Nekki		
2011	Dynasty Warriors 7		Cao Pi		
2011	Dead or Alive: Dimensions		Jann Lee		
2011	Doctor Lautrec and the Forgotten Knights		Jacques-Marie Vuidokku		
2011	Saint Seiya Senki		Camus		
2011	Initial D Arcade Stage 6 AA		Kai Kogashiwa		
2011	Warriors: Legends of Troy		Achilles	Japanese dub	
2012	All Kamen Rider: Rider Generation 2		Kamen Rider Skull		
2012	Kamen Rider: Super Climax Heroes		Kamen Rider Skull		
2012	Shining Blade				
2012	2nd Super Robot Wars Original Generation		Axel Almer		
2012	Dead or Alive 5		Jann Lee		
2012	Yakuza 5		Hiroshi Kugihara		
2013	Dynasty Warriors 8		Cao Pi		
2013	Initial D Arcade Stage 7 AAX		Kai Kogashiwa		
2013	Kamen Rider Battride War		Kamen Rider Skull		
2013	Macross 30: Voices across the Galaxy		Basara Nekki		
2014	Kamen Rider Battride War II		Kamen Rider Skull		
2014	3rd Super Robot Taisen Z Jigoku Hen		Basara Nekki		
2015	Fate/Grand Order		Cú Chulainn, Orion		
2016	Super Robot Taisen Original Generation: The Moon Dwellers		Axel Almer		
2018	Super Smash Bros. Ultimate		Knuckles the Echidna		
2019	Arknights		Wang		
2019	Dead or Alive 6		Jann Lee		
2021	Guilty Gear -STRIVE-		Anji Mito		
2023	Fate/Samurai Remnant		Lancer/Cú Chulainn		

=== Tokusatsu ===
Year	Title	Role	Notes	Sources
2005	Kamen Rider Hibiki & The Seven Senki	Makamou Hitotsumi	Movie	
2007	Kamen Rider Den-O	Scorpion imagin	Ep. 23 - 24	
2010	Kamen Rider OOO	Pteranodon Yummy (♂)	Ep. 32 - 33	
2014	Ressha Sentai ToQger	Keeper Rook	Ep. 24	
2016	Doubutsu Sentai Zyuohger	Bangray	Eps. 23 - 35	

=== Drama CDs ===
Title	Role	Notes	Sources
Amai Yūuten	Kyōji Hashizume		
Daisuki	Atsushi Tanaka		
Hanashizu no Utage	Akira Fujishiro		
Last Order	Akinori Takamiya		
Love Song ~Hanbun Tenshi~	Shinichi Sakan		
Mizu no Kioku	Toshihiko Hoshino		
Ōrin Gakuen series 2: Ai no Sainō	Masayoshi Ozaki		

=== Dubbing roles ===
==== Live-action ====
Title	Role	Voice dub for	Notes	Source
2 Days in the Valley	Alvin Strayer	Jeff Daniels		
24 Hours to Live	Jim Morrow	Paul Anderson		
9/11	Jeffery Cage	Charlie Sheen		
Aliens	Private Hudson	Bill Paxton		
Ambulance	LAPD Captain Monroe	Garrett Hedlund		
Amores perros	Octavio	Gael García Bernal		
Angel-A	André Moussah	Jamel Debbouze		
Bride of Chucky	Jesse	Nick Stabile		
Cruel Intentions	Sebastian Valmont	Ryan Phillippe		
The Deuce	C.C.	Gary Carr		
Deadpool & Wolverine	Johnny Storm / Human Torch	Chris Evans		
Fantastic Four	Johnny Storm / Human Torch	Chris Evans		
Fantastic Four: Rise of the Silver Surfer	Johnny Storm / Human Torch	Chris Evans		
Gladiator	Commodus	Joaquin Phoenix		
Hackers	Dade Murphy / Zero Cool / Crash Override	Jonny Lee Miller		
I Know What You Did Last Summer	Barry Cox	Ryan Phillippe		
I Love You Phillip Morris	Jimmy	Rodrigo Santoro		
In a Valley of Violence	Deputy Gilly Martin	James Ransone		
Jarhead	Chris Kruger	Lucas Black		
Joshua	Brad Cairn	Sam Rockwell		
The Last Days on Mars	Vincent Campbell	Liev Schreiber		
The League of Extraordinary Gentlemen	Tom Sawyer	Shane West		
Lord of War	Vitaly Orlov	Jared Leto		
Love, Honour and Obey	Jonny	Jonny Lee Miller		
The Martian	Mark Watney	Matt Damon		
Never Been Kissed	Rob Geller	David Arquette		
Once Upon a Time	Baelfire / Neal Cassidy	Michael Raymond-James		
The Recruit	Zack	Gabriel Macht		
Same Kind of Different as Me	Ron Hall	Greg Kinnear		
School of Rock	Mr. Finn	Tony Cavalero		
Scream	Randy Meeks	Jamie Kennedy		
Scream 2	Randy Meeks	Jamie Kennedy		
Seabiscuit	Red Pollard	Tobey Maguire		
Somewhere	Johnny Marco	Stephen Dorff		
Splendid Politics	Yi Hon/Prince Gwanghae	Cha Seung-won		
This Means War	Franklin "FDR" Foster	Chris Pine		
Unaccompanied Minors	Zach Van Bourke	Wilmer Valderrama		
Untraceable	Detective Eric Box	Billy Burke		
Wayward Pines	Dr. Theodore Yedlin	Jason Patric		
We Are Your Friends	James Reed	Wes Bentley		

==== Animation ====
Title	Role	Notes	Source
Capture the Flag	Richard Carson III		
The Little Mermaid II: Return to the Sea	Flounder		
Love, Death & Robots	XBOT 4000		
My Little Pony: Friendship Is Magic	Spot		
Rocko's Modern Life: Static Cling	Heffer		
Thomas & Friends	Tom Tipper	Season 4 (Episode 104)	
