= Desucon =

Annual anime convention in Finland

- Genre: Anime convention
- Venue: Sibelius Hall
- Locations: Lahti, Finland
- Inaugurated: 2009
- Website: desucon.fi

Desucon is an anime convention held in the Sibelius Hall in Lahti, Finland, for fans of Japanese folk culture.

== History ==
Desucon was held for the 14th time in 2023. Since 2016, attendance has been limited to only those over 18. In addition to the main event held in June, a winter-time Desucon Frostbite is organized in either January or February. Both events were on hiatus due to the COVID-19 pandemic starting from summer 2020.

== Organization ==
The events presented include lectures, workshops, cosplay, an artists' alley, a merchants' hall, a games area and video screenings. The Desucon events also welcomed many Japanese guests, ranging from seiyuu to singers, mangakas, speakers and filmmakers.
