= Berserk and the Band of the Hawk =

2016 video game

- Developer: Omega Force
- Publisher: Koei Tecmo
- Directors: Dai Kawai; Jun Kawahara
- Producer: Hisashi Koinuma
- Designer: Genki Fujimori
- Programmer: Yoshinao Yamagishi
- Writers: Masahiro Kato; Keisuke Okabayashi
- Composers: Masako Otsuka; Kosuke Mizukami; Ippo Igarashi
- Series: Berserk; Dynasty Warriors
- Platforms: PlayStation 3 PlayStation 4 PlayStation Vita; Microsoft Windows
- Release: PlayStation 3: JP: October 27, 2016; PlayStation 4, PlayStation Vita: JP: October 27, 2016; NA: February 21, 2017; EU: February 24, 2017; Microsoft Windows: WW: February 21, 2017
- Genre: Hack and slash
- Mode: Single-player

Berserk and the Band of the Hawk, known in Japan as Berserk Musou (Japanese: ベルセルク無双, Hepburn: Beruseruku Musō), is a Musō game developed by Omega Force and published by Koei Tecmo for PlayStation 3, PlayStation 4, PlayStation Vita, and Microsoft Windows. It is a collaboration between Koei Tecmo's Dynasty Warriors video game series and Kentaro Miura's Berserk manga series. Berserk and the Band of the Hawk was released for PlayStation 3, PlayStation 4 and PlayStation Vita in Japan on October 27, 2016, and worldwide for Microsoft Windows, PlayStation 4 and PlayStation Vita in February 2017.

== Gameplay ==
Berserk and the Band of the Hawk mixes the hack-and-slash gameplay of Koei Tecmo's Dynasty Warriors series of video games, with the setting and characters from the Berserk manga series by Kentaro Miura.

== Plot ==
The game follows parts of the story of the manga series, starting at the chronological beginning with the Golden Age Arc and ending in the Hawk of the Millennium Empire Arc. The Guardians of Desire arc (Vol 1-3) featured chronologically after the Golden Age arc and its immediate follow-up, the Lost Children arc, are skipped.

== Development ==
Berserk and the Band of the Hawk was first revealed in a short promotion video by Koei Tecmo on June 12, 2016, prior to Electronic Entertainment Expo 2016. A release for PlayStation 4, PlayStation Vita, as well as PlayStation 3 in Japan and Microsoft Windows in western territories, were confirmed. A week later, on June 20, a flyer was sent out in Japan, which confirmed a September 21 release in the country. In an interview, producer Hisashi Koinuma ensured fans that the team aims for a CERO D rating for the game in Japan and will do anything to avoid a CERO Z rating. The Z rating is the equivalent of the "Adults Only" rating by the North American board ESRB. On July 15, 2016, Koei Tecmo revealed that the western version of the game was planned to release in Fall 2016. However, when the game's official localized name was revealed, Koei Tecmo announced new release dates, being February 21, 2017 for North America and February 24, 2017 for Europe. On December 1, 2016, Koei Tecmo America revealed its Endless Eclipse Mode, a new detail for battle mechanics and alternative armaments.

In Japan, first-print copies of the game included a bathing outfit for Casca for in the game.

In North America, pre-ordered copies of the game would include codes for DLC costumes. The game supports PS4 Pro which targets 60fps in 1080p.

== Reception ==
Reception

Aggregate score
Aggregator	Score
Metacritic	PC: 54/100; PS4: 66/100

Review scores
Publication	Score
Destructoid	8/10
Famitsu	35/40
GameSpot	5/10
IGN	6.3/10

Berserk and the Band of the Hawk received "mixed or average" reviews, according to video game review aggregator Metacritic.

Destructoid awarded it a score of 8 out of 10, saying "Seeing the story continue past the Golden Age is enough for an enthusiast to buy in. Otherwise, wait for the price to match what's being offered." Famitsu's four reviewers gave it scores of 9, 9, 9 and 8 out of ten, equalling a total of 35/40. GameSpot awarded it a score of 5 out of 10, praising its story mode but criticising its secondary modes. IGN awarded a score of 6.3 out of 10, saying "Berserk fits the Dynasty Warriors mold well in Band of the Hawk, but the too-easy combat still gets very repetitive."

=== Sales ===
The PlayStation 4 version has sold 32,751 copies in Japan while the Windows version has sold 24,904 copies.
