= Griffith (Berserk) =

Fictional character from Berserk

- Berserk character
- Griffith, as illustrated by Kentaro Miura
- First appearance: Berserk chapter L0: "Golden Age (4)" (1991)
- Created by: Kentaro Miura
- Voiced by: Japanese: Toshiyuki Morikawa (1997 anime); Takahiro Sakurai (films, 2016 anime); English: Kevin T. Collins (1997 anime, films); Steve Staley (2016 anime)

In-universe information
- Aliases: Wings of Darkness; White Hawk; Hawk of Light; Hawk of Darkness; Blessed King of Longing; The Absolute
- Relatives: Charlotte (fiancée)
- Affiliations: Band of the Hawk (former leader); God Hand (member); Reborn Band of the Hawk (leader)

Griffith (Japanese: グリフィス, Hepburn: Gurifisu) is a fictional character and the main antagonist of the manga series Berserk created by Kentaro Miura. Extraordinarily handsome, charismatic, and skilled, Griffith is the leader of the mercenary group the Band of the Hawk. After meeting Guts, Griffith defeats him in battle and forces him to join the Band of the Hawk as the latter proclaims he now "owns" him. The dynamic and turbulent relationship between Guts and Griffith forms the primary focus of the manga. During the Eclipse, to achieve his dream of obtaining a kingdom, he sacrifices the Band of the Hawk to become the new member of the God Hand and is rechristened as "the wings of darkness" Femto (フェムト, Femuto).

== Concept and creation ==
In an interview, author Kentaro Miura revealed that his friendship with later fellow manga artist Kōji Mori partially inspired the relationship between Guts and Griffith. Miura stated that he did not plan Griffith's antagonism from the start and began to do so during the third volume. Miura said: "First of all, if Guts is angry, there is going to have to be an object of that anger. So I asked myself what people get angry at, and, well, something you see a lot of is the murderer of one's parents, but as I already said, I was someone who friendship mattered a lot to, so the idea of making the target of Guts's anger a friend, or at least a man of the same general age, naturally came to mind."

Miura stated that he had originally intended to make Femto, Griffith's God Hand incarnation, Guts's enemy. But after finishing the Golden Age arc, Griffith's character stood out too much and Miura wanted him to fight Guts in that form, as "him being in the same form as before but powered up would make the course of their confrontation easier to convey." When told that Griffith began to look like a protagonist during the story's shift to Griffith's struggle against Ganishka, Miura stated that he intended to "depict Griffith as the character who hardly ever talks about his own mental state, but gathering characters around him who express their feelings has the converse effect of elevating Griffith himself."

== Appearances ==
=== Berserk manga ===
A street urchin as a child, Griffith dreamed of acquiring his own kingdom since childhood. As a masterful tactician and swordsman of near-unparalleled skill, Griffith is introduced as the founding leader of the mercenary unit the Band of the Hawk. He is described as an exceptionally beautiful and charismatic man who inspires desire and devotion in both women and men alike. After defeating Guts in a duel, he forcibly recruits him in the Band of the Hawk, eventually making him his second-in-command. Three years later, they end the Hundred-Year War and bring peace to Midland. After overhearing Griffith proclaim that he only considers those with their own dreams equals, Guts defeats Griffith in a duel and leaves the Band of the Hawk to discover his own dream. This prompts a distraught Griffith to sleep with Princess Charlotte in a moment of weakness, leading to his imprisonment and crippling torture for one year before being rescued by the reunited Band of the Hawk. Realizing his current invalid state and despairing over his inability to achieve his dream, Griffith triggers the Crimson Behelit he received as a child and invokes an Eclipse, an appearance of the demonic God Hand.

The God Hand remind Griffith of his ambition and offer him the choice to sacrifice the Band of the Hawk in order to be reborn as their final member. Griffith meets the power behind the God Hand and learns that everything was arranged for him to become a messiah to judge humanity's final fate. After using the souls of the sacrificed to ascend into the form of Femto, he proceeds to rape Casca in front of Guts, corrupting her unborn child as a result. The Skull Knight then rescues Guts and Casca before they can be sacrificed, beginning Guts' quest for revenge against Griffith.

Two years later, Griffith reincarnates into the Physical World through the body of Guts and Casca's tainted child through the millennial Incarnation Ceremony at Albion, orchestrated by the Egg of the Perfect World. Following an encounter with Guts, Griffith creates a new Band of the Hawk made up of humans and Apostles to oppose the invading Kushan army as leader of Midland's armies with backing from the Holy See Church. Upon inflicting a fatal injury on Ganishika to create a global interstice, a mixing of the physical and supernatural worlds, Griffith establishes the kingdom of Falconia as the last bastion of humanity under his rule. Griffith soon discovers that his body is being periodically overtaken by Guts and Casca's child, who longs to return to his parents. Upon re-asserting control before them on the island of Elfhelm, Griffith defeats Guts and abducts Casca before destroying Elfhelm.

=== Other appearances ===
Griffith is a playable character in the video game Berserk and the Band of the Hawk and is a main antagonist in Berserk: Millennium Falcon Hen Seima Senki no Shō.

== Reception ==
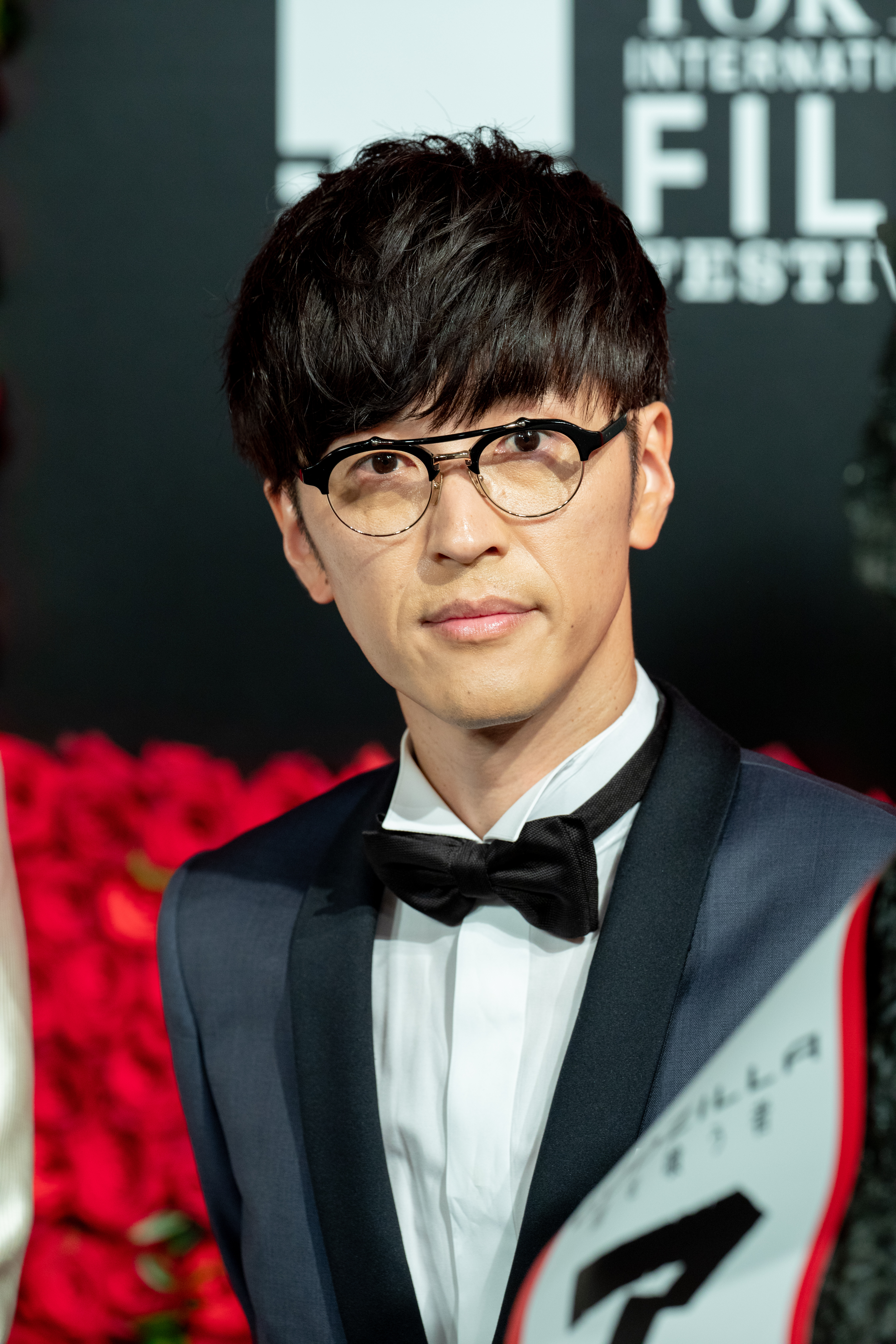
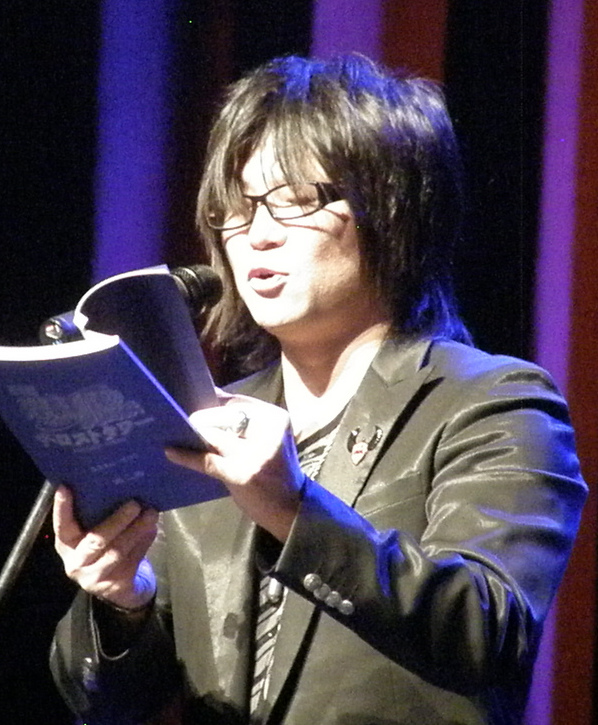
Takahiro Sakurai (left) and Toshiyuki Morikawa (right) voiced Griffith in Japanese, respectively.

Griffith's characterization has been the subject of scholarship, including analysis of whether his betrayal at the end of the Golden Age Arc was an autonomous decision or caused by external factors beyond his control. In her analysis of transhumanism and its connected ethical issues in Berserk, Natalia Kućma discusses Griffith, mentioning the modification of his "subjectivity and physicality in exchange for the realization of his dream of his own kingdom."

Anne Lauenroth of Anime News Network called Griffith the "perfect villain", praising the human aspect of his character and his hamartia that leads to his choice in the Eclipse. Griffith placed second in Paste's list of the "20 of the Greatest Villains in Anime", with Toussaint Egan calling him the "perfect foil to Berserk's Guts—two men whose battle against one another epitomizes the thematic struggle between fate and self-determination. Make no mistake, Griffith is a villain of Luciferian proportions."

Daniel Briscoe of The Fandom Post noted Griffith to be an enigmatic character for being incredibly skillful yet compassionate, stating that "someone so skilled at leading and fighting to have these characteristics makes it all the more intriguing." LaNeysha Campbell praised Griffith's development in Volume 4, saying that Griffith's devious side in previous chapters and its lead up to his heinous betrayal of his loyal followers "solidifies him as villain who will be a formidable antagonist going forward." Skyler Allen praised Miura's execution of the Eclipse, stating that "Griffith betraying everyone who ever cared for him serves as a final statement on ambition. Berserk always framed ambition as something crucial to being human, but the Eclipse reminds us that it can just as easily lead to abandoning our humanity. Griffith's ambition took him to great heights, but also turned him into a literal and metaphorical monster."
