= Berserk (manga) =

Japanese manga series by Kentaro Miura

- First tankōbon volume cover, featuring Guts

ベルセルク (Beruseruku)
- Genre: Dark fantasy; Epic fantasy; Sword and sorcery
- Manga
- Written by: Kentaro Miura (vol. 1–41); Kouji Mori (vol. 42–) (Note: Following Miura's death in May 2021, Mori took on the role of "supervisor" of the manga.)
- Illustrated by: Kentaro Miura (vol. 1–41); Studio Gaga (vol. 42–) (Note: The studio consisted of Miura's former assistants: Yoshimitsu Kurosaki, Akio Miyaji, Nobuhiro Hirai, Naohide Nagashima, Hideaki Sugimoto and Shigeru Kinoshita.)
- Published by: Hakusensha
- English publisher: NA: Dark Horse Comics
- Imprint: Jets Comics; (former); Young Animal Comics; (current)
- Magazine: Monthly Animal House; (1989–1992); Young Animal; (1992–present)
- Original run: August 25, 1989 – present
- Volumes: 43
- Anime television series
- 1997–98 series; 2016–17 series; The Golden Age Arc – Memorial Edition (2022)
- Anime film series
- The Golden Age Arc (2012–13)
- icon

Berserk (Japanese: ベルセルク, Hepburn: Beruseruku) is a Japanese manga series created by Kentaro Miura. Set in a medieval Europe–inspired dark fantasy world, the story centers on the swordsman Guts and Griffith, the leader of a mercenary group called the Band of the Hawk. The series follows Guts's journey seeking revenge on Griffith, who betrayed him and the rest of their comrades.

Miura premiered a prototype of Berserk in 1988. The series began publication the following year in Hakusensha's seinen manga magazine Monthly Animal House, which was changed to the semimonthly magazine Young Animal in 1992, where Berserk has since continued its publication. Following Miura's death in May 2021, the final chapter that he worked on was published posthumously in September of that same year; the series resumed in June 2022, under the supervision of Miura's fellow manga artist and childhood friend Kouji Mori and Miura's group of assistants and apprentices from Studio Gaga. As of August 2025, the Berserk chapters have been collected in 43 tankōbon volumes.

Berserk was first adapted into anime format as a 25-episode television series produced by OLM and covering the manga's Golden Age story arc, aired from October 1997 to April 1998. A trilogy of theatrical anime films, produced by Studio 4°C and also covering the Golden Age arc, was released between 2012 and 2013. A second 24-episode anime television series adaptation, produced by Liden Films and animated by GEMBA and Millepensee, was broadcast in two seasons in 2016 and 2017.

Berserk has been widely acclaimed, particularly for its dark setting, storytelling, characters, and Miura's detailed artwork. By August 2025, the manga had over 70 million copies in circulation worldwide, making it one of the best-selling manga series of all time. It received the Award for Excellence at the sixth annual Tezuka Osamu Cultural Prize in 2002.

== Plot ==
Guts is born from the corpse of his hanged mother and is raised by Gambino, an abusive mercenary captain. After Gambino's death, Guts becomes a wandering warrior whose combat prowess attracts Griffith, leader of the Band of the Hawk. Griffith defeats him in battle and compels him to join the mercenary group. During his time with the Hawks, Guts learns of Griffith's ambition to rule a kingdom and the mysterious Crimson Behelit he possesses. The demonic warrior Nosferatu Zodd spares their lives upon recognizing the Behelit, warning Guts that his bond with Griffith will bring calamity. As Griffith rises in Midland's political circles, Guts grows close to Casca, the Hawks' sole female commander. Upon hearing Griffith declare that he only regards those with their own dreams as equals, Guts resolves to leave the Hawks to seek his own purpose. Griffith refuses unless Guts defeats him in single combat. Though victorious, Guts's departure triggers Griffith's downfall, leading to his arrest after he seduces Princess Charlotte. Tortured and broken, Griffith loses the Behelit, and the Midland army annihilates most of the Hawks in a brutal ambush. Guts, separated and unaware of these events, is confronted by The Skull Knight who warns Guts of an impending Eclipse. A year after separation from his comrades, Guts learns of a sneak attack on the Band of the Hawk, prompting him to rejoin the survivors and rescue Griffith. During this time, Guts and Casca confess their love for one another.

The rescued Griffith is left physically ruined, but when his Behelit activates, it summons the Eclipse—a convergence of realms where the Godhand offer him godhood in exchange for sacrificing his comrades. Branded as offerings, the Hawks are slaughtered by Apostles, demonic beings once human, with only Guts and Casca surviving. Griffith, reborn as the demonic Femto, rapes Casca as Guts loses an eye and arm trying to protect her. The Skull Knight rescues them, but Casca is left mentally broken. Marked by the Brand of Sacrifice, Guts entrusts Casca to the care of the blacksmith Godo, his adopted daughter Erica, and Rickert—the only Hawk untouched by the Eclipse—before arming himself with the Dragonslayer and a prosthetic arm. He wages a vengeful war against Apostles while being haunted by the Demon Child, his and Casca's unborn son, corrupted by Femto's violation.

Years later, Guts, now renowned as the "Black Swordsman", travels with the elf Puck. Captured by Farnese of the Holy Iron Chain Knights, he escapes after saving her and returns to Godo, only to find Casca missing. His search leads him to St. Albion, where the Godhand prepare a ritual to incarnate one of their own. Amidst refugees fleeing the Kushan Empire, Guts rescues Casca from the fanatic Mozgus as the dead rise, forming a massive Brand of Sacrifice. Farnese, her bodyguard Serpico, and the thief Isidro join him, while an Apostle beneath the city consumes the Demon Child, using its essence to restore Griffith to physical form. After battling Griffith and Zodd at Godo's home, Griffith senses lingering traces of the Demon Child's emotions within him. Seeking a haven for Casca, Guts resolves to travel to Elfhelm, allowing Farnese, Serpico, and Isidro to accompany him—partly fearing his own growing rage may endanger her. Meanwhile, Griffith reforms the Band of the Hawk with Apostles, waging war against the rogue Apostle Ganishka.

Guts's party liberates a village from trolls, encountering the witch Flora, her apprentice Schierke, and the elf Ivalera. Flora gifts Guts the Berserker Armor, enhancing his strength at the cost of his sanity. After Apostles kill Flora, the Moonlight Child—later revealed as the Demon Child—appears before vanishing. The Skull Knight confirms Elfhelm's potential to heal Casca but warns of the armor's dangers. Boarding Roderick's ship, they evade a Kushan attack, during which Guts briefly clashes with Ganishka. Griffith slays the emperor, merging the physical and astral worlds, then establishes Falconia as humanity's last refuge. During the voyage, the Moonlight Child reappears, and the group battles a sea monster and undead pirates as Farnese begins studying magic under Schierke.

Recruiting the merrow Isma, they reach Elfhelm, where the elven sage Danann restores Casca's mind. The Skull Knight reveals the Berserker Armor's dark origins and his own history with the Godhand's Void. The Moonlight Child is exposed as the Demon Child, briefly usurping Griffith's body before Griffith reasserts control, abducts Casca, and destroys Elfhelm's spirit tree—scattering its inhabitants into the astral realm. As survivors flee aboard the Seahorse, Guts collapses in despair. In Falconia, Casca regains fragmented memories before being recaptured. Guts resists his inner darkness but falls unconscious as Kushan warriors—led by Silat, Daiba, and Rickert—board the ship.

Imprisoned by the Kushan, Guts learns from Daiba that Falconia's forces are advancing—Griffith's attack on Elfhelm was only the beginning. Drafted into the Kushan resistance, Guts's party prepares for war. During a royal gathering, the Apostle Rakshas unleashes trolls upon the city. Silat rallies the defense while Farnese's magic drives Rakshas into retreat. The assassin flees to Guts's cell, where a despairing Guts welcomes death—until Silat intervenes, with Rakshas retreating. In the aftermath, Guts is led away by Kushan Brahmins under Daiba's orders, sealed within an ancient tomb. He enters a meditative state there and is forced by a mysterious entity to confront his inner darkness. After awakening, Guts reopens the tomb with renewed strength. Meanwhile, Schierke's astral projection scouts Falconia for Casca, her unconscious body concealing the endeavor.

== Production ==
=== Development ===
While working briefly as an assistant to manga artist George Morikawa at age 18, Kentaro Miura had already conceived early ideas for Berserk, including a dark warrior with a gigantic sword—a prototype of Guts—which he included in his portfolio. Miura submitted manuscripts to a shōnen manga magazine for approximately four years before joining Hakusensha, but felt his skills were insufficient and noted the magazine's lack of interest in science fiction or fantasy. In 1988, while collaborating with Buronson on King of Wolves, Miura published a prototype of Berserk in Hakusensha's Gekkan ComiComi, a 48-page work that placed second in the seventh ComiComi Manga-School competition.

Berserk was initially conceived as a fantasy series for a shōnen audience, consistent with the magazine that had published Miura's earlier award-winning work. He later submitted it to a magazine that was "on the verge of going under" and was assigned several editors before meeting his first permanent editor. Serialization began in Hakusensha's Monthly Animal House in 1989. Miura noted that he secured a serialization immediately upon his debut, which limited the editorial criticism he received. At the start of serialization, Miura did not have a detailed long-term plan for the narrative. His primary goal was to develop a "dark hero" within the fantasy genre, which was then underrepresented, citing Bastard!! as a rare contemporary example. As his first original serial, Miura acknowledged uncertainty about the story's direction, prioritizing the creation of an unconventional protagonist.

=== Concept and influences ===
Miura stated that the title "Berserk" was chosen for its enigmatic and impactful quality, rather than being based on a pre-developed concept of berserkers or the Berserker Armor, which was introduced later. The word also aligned with the imagery of Guts, partly inspired by the vengeful, rage-driven protagonist of Mad Max in a grim setting.

The series's world drew inspiration from films such as Hellraiser (1987) and The Name of the Rose (1986), the art of M. C. Escher, and the Brothers Grimm's fairy tales. The dark fantasy setting and medieval European aesthetic were influenced by Conan the Barbarian (1982), Excalibur (1981), and the Elric of Melniboné series. Miura emphasized realism in creature designs to anchor the fantastical elements. Miura did not regard dark fantasy as a distinct genre but rather as equivalent to general fantasy. He observed that major Western fantasies like The Lord of the Rings incorporated dark elements, whereas Japanese fantasy, popularized by children's video games like Dragon Quest, often omitted them. Influenced more by novels than games, Miura "naturally turned to dark fantasy." Initially debating between a historical or fantasy narrative, Miura chose the latter for creative freedom. He incorporated anachronistic technology, such as Guts's arm cannon, and deliberately avoided historical accuracy, blending various eras into a cohesive anachronistic whole. He recognized this might confuse European readers but compared it to Western stereotyping of Japan with ninjas, noting his primary focus was a Japanese audience with no intent to cater internationally.

Miura cited Fist of the North Star by Buronson and Tetsuo Hara as the most significant influence on his work and artistic style. Early artistic influences included animator and manga artist Yoshikazu Yasuhiko and manga artist Fujihiko Hosono. The series's story and atmosphere were inspired by Violence Jack by Go Nagai and Guin Saga by Kaoru Kurimoto; backgrounds were influenced by Masatoshi Uchizaki's Ranpo; and designs drew from Nagai's Devilman and the films RoboCop (1987) and Batman (1989). Miura cited Katsuhiro Otomo's Akira as a foundational influence on his panel composition, having studied its framing and angles extensively as a student. His favorite manga was Dororo by Osamu Tezuka, and he aimed to create a fantasy with dark, "muddy", and yōkai-like elements. Miura stated he learned storytelling fundamentals from George Lucas, naming the original Star Wars (1977) as his favorite film. Miura also noted the influence of shōjo manga on the series, particularly in "expressing every feeling powerfully." Specific influences included Yumiko Ōshima and Moto Hagio, while the anime adaptations of The Rose of Versailles and Aim for the Ace!, both directed by Osamu Dezaki, led him to read The Rose of Versailles manga and works by Keiko Takemiya, especially Kaze to Ki no Uta.

Aspects of Guts's personality and design were partially inspired by Miura's high school friend and fellow manga artist Kouji Mori, by Mad Max's Max Rockatansky, and by Rutger Hauer's roles in Flesh and Blood (1985), Blade Runner (1982), The Hitcher (1986), and The Blood of Heroes (1989). Miura also noted a visual resemblance between Guts and Connor MacLeod from Highlander (1986). Guts's prosthetic hand was inspired by Hyakkimaru from Dororo and the protagonist of Cobra. The size of Guts's sword, the Dragon Slayer, was inspired by Kurt from Shinji Wada's Pygmalio and an illustration of a giant wielding a sword in The Snow Queen, a Guin Saga spin-off. When drawing the Dragon Slayer, Miura aimed to emulate the impact of Kenshiro's or Raoh's fist in Fist of the North Star, seeking to convey a similar sense of weight and an "extension of reality" to make it believable. Miura stated that "Black Swordsman" Guts was his initial concept, but the character's backstory was developed later, around the third or fourth volume.

Some aspects of Griffith's personality were also inspired by Mori; however, Miura noted that the roles of inspiration for Guts and Griffith were sometimes interchangeable, expressing, "Sometimes I would be Guts, and sometimes I would be Griffith." Miura and Mori's friendship dynamic also partially influenced the relationship between Guts and Griffith. The Band of the Hawk was inspired by Miura's high school friends.

=== Frequency ===
Berserk is known for its frequent and often extended hiatuses, which date back to late 2006. Following a pause, three consecutive chapters depicting Guts's childhood were published from June 8 to July 13, 2012. The main storyline resumed eight months later on October 12, before another hiatus began after a chapter was published on December 28. Miura then paused the series to work on the six-chapter miniseries Giganto Maxia. Berserk subsequently published chapters intermittently from April 11 to September 26, 2014.

After a 10-month hiatus, the manga resumed on July 24, 2015, publishing monthly until November 27, before entering another hiatus. It was published monthly again from June 24 to September 23, 2016, before pausing once more. The series resumed from March 24 to June 23, 2017, and then published monthly from December 22, 2017, to May 25, 2018. A single chapter was published on August 24, 2018, followed by an eight-month hiatus. Two chapters were published on April 26 and August 23, 2019. Three chapters followed on April 24, July 22, and October 23, 2020. The final chapter published during Miura's lifetime was released on January 22, 2021.

=== Miura's death and series resumption ===
On May 20, 2021, Hakusensha announced that Miura had died at the age of 54 on May 6 from an acute aortic dissection, leaving the future of the series undecided. The posthumous 364th chapter, which was Miura's final work, was published in Young Animal on September 10 of that year. The manuscript was completed by members of Miura's Studio Gaga, his team of assistants and apprentices. The magazine issue served as a memorial to Miura, featuring a special "Messages to Kentarou Miura" booklet and a poster of notable scenes from the manga. Hakusensha stated that the future of the series remained uncertain and that the priority would "always be placed on him—what he would think if he were still with us." The afterword in the manga's 41st volume, released in December 2021, reiterated that the future of the series was still undecided.

On June 7, 2022, Hakusensha and Kouji Mori announced that the series would continue, based on plans and thoughts relayed to Mori by Miura, along with memorandums and character designs left by the author. Mori recounted a discussion with Miura nearly 30 years prior, during which Miura outlined the manga's entire storyline. Mori stated that the story had since progressed "exactly as we discussed at the time, with almost no changes." As the only person familiar with Miura's intended ending, Mori agreed to supervise the continuation, vowing, "I will only write the episodes that Miura talked to me about. I will not flesh it out. I will not write episodes that I don't remember clearly. I will only write the lines and stories that Miura described to me."

In a 2023 interview commemorating the release of the 42nd volume, Mori described Miura as "a manga genius bursting with talent," who possessed "an eagerness to see things through to the end as well as an outstanding ability to paint, conceive stories and employ narrative devices effectively." Mori initially believed continuing the series without Miura would be impossible but changed his mind after collaborating with Studio Gaga to complete the final chapter. He was motivated to continue by the thought that Miura would be mad at him if he did nothing. Regarding his role, Mori expressed mixed feelings: "It may be unforgivable for me to do it, now that Miura is no longer here," and reaffirmed his commitment: "I will never add my own twist. I will simply remember and convey what Miura told me."

Berserk has continued with the credits appearing as "original work by Kentaro Miura, art by Studio Gaga, supervised by Kouji Mori". The "Fantasia Arc/Elf Island Chapter" concluded with chapters released from June 24, 2022, to May 26, 2023; a new story arc began on September 22 of that same year.

== Themes and analysis ==
Berserk explores a wide range of themes. Free will, destiny, and causality are among the most prominent. Human resilience is also a recurring theme, as many characters come from traumatic backgrounds and struggle against an unjust world. Guts struggles against destiny itself, resisting the pull of predetermination. Griffith embodies this idea of resilience by pursuing his dream of ruling a kingdom despite his lowborn origins, as well as free will, through his decision to sacrifice the Band of the Hawk to achieve his goal.

The series also explores human nature and morality, as characters are torn between acting morally or succumbing to madness and evil. Guts is initially presented as an antihero indifferent to killing and those who aid him; he does not operate within conventional definitions of right and wrong. As the story progresses, he is revealed to be deeply conflicted internally. His tragic past, unfolded in the Golden Age arc, reveals a more complex character. Anne Lauenroth of Anime News Network wrote that Griffith is "not evil at all", but "arrogant and brutally realistic about human nature." The suppression of his own humanity initiates his demise as the Hawk and his transformation into Femto.

Friendship, camaraderie, and human relations are other explored themes. As a child, Guts attempted to build friendships within his mercenary group, but a traumatic experience caused him to lose trust in people. Through his time with Griffith and the Band of the Hawk, Guts forms bonds and matures as an individual. Miura stated that he based the Band of the Hawk on his own high school relationships and experiences. Miura commented that the death of the group was decided upon since the beginning of the Golden Age arc. This decision was supported by his editor, but caused the series to decline in popularity among readers. He added that continuing the series without killing the group would have required high-level scriptwriting techniques, but doing so would have taken the series in a different direction, commenting that it would have resembled Akira Miyashita's Sakigake!! Otokojuku, where characters who are supposed to be dead keep coming back to life.

Miura mentioned that his friendship with fellow manga artist Kouji Mori partially inspired the relationship between Guts and Griffith. Jacob Chapman of Anime News Network wrote that through their friendship, Guts's ambitions were elevated and Griffith's were lowered, allowing both to consider a new future; however, they rejected this future due to personal fears—Guts felt unworthy of happiness, and Griffith feared his dream becoming mundane. Miura also said the conflict between Guts and Griffith reflects their changed personalities.

The Golden Age arc has been compared to a Greek tragedy. According to Lauenroth, Griffith's hamartia lies in how he compartmentalizes his feelings of guilt and shame to pursue his dream. His inner dialogue during his second duel with Guts, "If I can't have him, I don't care", marks the Golden Age arc's peripeteia. When Guts attempts to rescue him during the Eclipse, Griffith reaches his moment of anagnorisis with the thought, "You're the only one... who made me forget my dream."

Betrayal and revenge are major themes. Guts experienced his first betrayal when Gambino sold him to another soldier. He later killed both the soldier and Gambino. Guts embarks on a quest for revenge after his comrades are betrayed by Griffith and sacrificed to the God Hand. This desire for vengeance becomes his primary reason for survival.

Religion is explored primarily through the characters of Mozgus and Farnese. Miura stated that he created Mozgus based on the concept of a rigid personality to depict a religious fanatic with no flexibility. Farnese is introduced as the figurehead of the Holy Iron Chain Knights, inquisitors tasked with burning heretics and witches. After encountering Guts, she struggles to reconcile her faith with the atrocities she has committed. Guts denounces prayer, claiming that clasping hands prevents people from fighting for their lives. Farnese eventually rejects her faith and rigid beliefs after learning the truth about Mozgus. Following the battle between Guts and Mozgus, she decides to follow Guts and seek a new purpose away from her social position and the church.

== Media ==
=== Manga ===
Written and illustrated by Kentaro Miura, Berserk debuted in Hakusensha's Monthly Animal House magazine on August 25, 1989. (Note: It debuted in the magazine's October 1989 issue, released on August 25 of that same year.) Hakusensha published the first tankōbon volume of Berserk under its Jets Comics imprint on November 26, 1990. In 1992, Monthly Animal House was replaced by Young Animal, where the series resumed publication in October of that same year. Miura continued the series's irregular publication in the semimonthly magazine until his death in May 2021; the series resumed in June 2022, under the supervision of Miura's fellow manga artist and childhood friend Kouji Mori, with illustrations by Miura's group of assistants and apprentices from Studio Gaga. In June 2016, Hakusensha's Jets Comics imprint was rebranded as Young Animal Comics, and the first thirty-seven volumes of Berserk were re-published with new cover arts. The posthumous 41st volume came in both regular and special editions; the latter included special canvas art drawn by Miura and a drama CD. The 42nd volume, the first one under supervision of Mori, was released on September 29, 2023. As of August 29, 2025, 43 volumes have been released.

In North America, Dark Horse Comics, in conjunction with Digital Manga Publishing, announced the license of the manga in 2003. The first volume was published on October 22, 2003. As of November 2, 2022, 41 volumes have been published. In September 2018, Dark Horse Comics announced a deluxe edition of Berserk, featuring hard covers and larger prints, with the first volume (collecting original volumes 1–3) released on February 27, 2019. The 14th and latest volume (collecting original volumes 40, 41, and Berserk Official Guidebook) was released on November 22, 2023.

=== Anime ===
==== First series (1997–1998) ====
Berserk was adapted into a 25-episode anime television series, produced by Nippon Television and VAP, animated by OLM, and directed by Naohito Takahashi. The first episode begins with the Black Swordsman arc and shifts into the Golden Age arc thereafter. It was broadcast on Nippon TV from October 8, 1997, to April 1, 1998. (Note: Berserk aired on Nippon TV on Tuesday midnight, effectively Wednesday at 1:45 a.m. JST.)

==== Film series (2012–2013) ====
Berserk's Golden Age arc was adapted into a trilogy of theatrical anime films by Studio 4°C. The first film, The Egg of the King, was released in Japan on February 4, 2012. The second film, The Battle for Doldrey, was released on June 23, 2012. The third film, The Advent, was released on February 1, 2013. A remastered television broadcast edition, labeled as "Memorial Edition", aired from October 2 to December 25, 2022.

==== Second series (2016–2017) ====
A second anime television series adaptation of Berserk was produced by Liden Films and animated by GEMBA and Millepensee. The series's 12-episode first season covered the manga's Conviction arc. It was broadcast on Wowow and MBS's Animeism anime programming block from July 1 to September 16, 2016. A 12-episode second season, which covered the first half of the manga's Falcon of the Millennium Empire arc, was broadcast from April 7 to June 23, 2017.

=== Video games ===
Two video games based on Berserk have been developed by Yuke's. The first game, Sword of the Berserk: Guts' Rage (ベルセルク 千年帝国の鷹篇 喪失花の章, Beruseruku Sennen Teikoku No Taka Hen Wasurebana no Shō; "Berserk—Millennium Falcon Arc: Chapter of the Lost Flowers"), was released for the Dreamcast in Japan by ASCII Corporation in late 1999. It was localized in western regions early the following year by Eidos Interactive.

The second game, Berserk: Millennium Falcon Hen Seima Senki no Shō (ベルセルク 千年帝国の鷹篇 聖魔戦記の章, Beruseruku Sennen Teikoku No Taka Hen Seima Senki no Shō; Berserk Millennium Falcon Arc: Chapter of the Record of the Holy Demon War), was published by Sammy Corporation exclusively in Japan on the PlayStation 2 in 2004.

A Berserk-themed spin-off of Omega Force's Dynasty Warriors series, titled Berserk and the Band of the Hawk (ベルセルク無双, Berserk Musou) was released on October 27, 2016, in Japan, and later in the U.S. on February 21, 2017, for PlayStation 4, PlayStation Vita and PC via Steam.

In a collaborative event with Dragon's Dogma, the weapons and armor sets from the Berserk: The Golden Age Arc films were added to the game, and Shin Megami Tensei: Liberation Dx2 made characters as they appeared in the 2016 TV series adaptation of Berserk playable. In December 2021, the MMORPG Lineage W announced a collaboration with Berserk, including the ability to play as Guts. In April 2025, Blizzard Entertainment announced a crossover event between the Diablo video game series and Berserk, featuring content in Diablo IV and Diablo Immortal. In Diablo IV, the ''Berserk Reliquary" event is scheduled to run from May 6 to June 3, with in-game bundles available until June 5. Rewards include the Berserker Armor, Skull Knight's Mount Armor, and Brand of Sacrifice. Diablo Immortal will include a boss battle against Nosferatu Zodd, and the Berserker Armor and Hawk of Light cosmetics. Weapon skins and login rewards will also part of the collaboration, set to run from May 1 to May 30.

=== Novel ===
A spin-off novel, titled Berserk: The Flame Dragon Knight (ベルセルク 炎竜の騎士, Beruseruku Enryū no Kishi), written by Makoto Fukami with illustrations by Kentaro Miura, was released on June 23, 2017. It is focused on the past of the new Band of the Hawk's apostle Grunbeld. In North America, the novel was published in English by Dark Horse on April 17, 2019.

=== Other media ===
Five Berserk art books and one guidebook have been released by Hakusensha:

- Berserk: Illustrations File, also known as Kentaro Miura – Berserk Illustration Book (三浦建太郎画集 ベルセルク, Miura Kentarō Gashū Beruseruku), released on February 26, 1997.
- Berserk: Kenpū Denki—Kanzen Kaiseki-sho (ベルセルク 剣風伝奇完全解析書, Beruseruku Kenpū Denki Kanzen Kaiseki-sho; "Berserk: Sword-Wind Chronicle—Complete Analysis Report"), an art book about the 1997 anime, released on December 9, 1998.
- Berserk: War Cry—Postcard Collection (ベルセルク ポストカードブック WAR CRY (雄叫び), Beruseruku Posutokādo Bukku Uō Kurai (Otakebi)), released on August 20, 1998.
- Berserk: Visual & Story File (ベルセルク ビジュアル＆ストーリーFILE, Beruseruku Bijuaru ando Sutōrī Fairu), art book about the video game Sword of the Berserk: Guts' Rage, released on December 22, 1999.
- Berserk Official Guidebook (ベルセルク オフィシャルガイドブック, Beruseruku Ofisharu Gaidobukku), was released by Hakusensha on September 23, 2016. It was published in North America by Dark Horse on September 19, 2018.
- The Artwork of Berserk was released for the 2021 Large Berserk Exhibition; it was sold exclusively during the event, but it was later announced that it would be available for purchase after the event.

A trading card game was released by Konami in Japan in 2003 and 2004. Berserk has spurred a line of statues and action figures produced by Art of War, Prime 1 Studio and First 4 Figures. Various figma figures by Max Factory based on the characters have been released, including Guts (Black Swordsman version, Band of the Hawk version, and Berserker Armor version), Griffith and Femto, Casca, and the Godhand. Berserk inspired two pachinko machines that feature original CG animation.

On September 18, 2018, to mark the release of the manga's 40th volume, a promotional video was released, featuring actor Shigeru Matsuzaki as Guts.

"Large Berserk Exhibition" (大ベルセルク展, Dai Beruseruku-ten), a special event to celebrate the 30th anniversary of Berserk, was announced in October 2020. It was originally scheduled to take place at the Sunshine City's Exhibition Hall A in Ikebukuro, Tokyo, from January 30 to February 15, 2021. However, due to COVID-19 pandemic concerns, the event was postponed. The event was rebranded as "Large Berserk Exhibition: Kentaro Miura's 32 Years of Artistry" (大ベルセルク展～三浦建太郎 画業32年の軌跡～, Dai Beruseruku-ten Miura Kentarō Gagyō 32-nen no Kiseki), and was held at the same location from September 10–23, 2021. The exhibition was held in Osaka from December 11, 2021, to January 30, 2022.

A drama CD, featuring the return of the 2016 anime's cast, portraying the "Awakening" chapter of the manga, was published with the special edition of the 41st volume of the manga on December 24, 2021.

== Reception ==
The 1988 prototype chapter of Berserk placed second at the seventh ComiComi's Manga-School prize. The manga was a finalist for the second, third, fourth, and fifth installments of the Tezuka Osamu Cultural Prize in 1998, 1999, 2000, and 2001, respectively. In 2002, Berserk earned Miura the Award for Excellence at the sixth installment of the Tezuka Osamu Cultural Prize, being awarded along with Takehiko Inoue, who won the Grand Prize for Vagabond. Berserk was one of the Manga Division's Jury Recommended Works at the fifth and sixth installments of the Japan Media Arts Festival Awards in 2001 and 2002, respectively. Berserk: Birth of the Black Swordsman, a 15-second video commercial for the 2016 anime television series adaptation, was one of the Entertainment Division's Jury Recommended Works at the 20th installment of the Japan Media Arts Festival Awards in 2017.

In 2016, Berserk ranked 38th on the 17th "Book of the Year" list by Da Vinci magazine; it ranked 44th on the 22nd list in 2022. On TV Asahi's Manga Sōsenkyo 2021 poll, in which 150,000 people voted for their top 100 manga series, Berserk ranked 91st.

In 2007, the manga received the prize of best seinen manga at the Japan Expo Awards. Berserk won the French AnimeLand's Anime & Manga Grand Prix for Best Classic Seinen in 2008, 2009 and 2013. It won the Spanish Manga Barcelona award for the seinen category in 2013 and 2021. The North American fourteenth volume of Dark Horse Comics's deluxe edition was nominated for the Harvey Awards in the Best Manga category in 2024.

=== Sales ===
From 2008 to 2025, volumes 33–43 of Berserk debuted in the top six on the Oricon weekly manga chart; (Note: Ranking of each volume: 33rd volume (2008): third; 34th volume (2009): first; 35th volume (2010): fourth; 36th volume (2011): third; 37th volume (2012): second; 38th volume (2016): third; 39th volume (2017): second; 40th volume (2018): first; 41st volume (2021): sixth; 42nd volume (2023): fourth; 43rd volume (2025): second) volumes 34 and 40 debuted first in 2009 and 2018, respectively. By July 2015, the manga had over 27 million copies in circulation in Japan and 8 million worldwide; over 40 million copies in circulation by January 2016; over 50 million copies in circulation (including digital versions) by May 2021; over 55 million copies in circulation (including digital versions) by October 2022; over 60 million copies in circulation (including digital versions) by September 2023; and over 70 million copies in circulation by August 2025.

Berserk received an Excellence Award of Hakusensha's Denshi Shoseki Taishō (E-Book Award) in 2015, which went to the publisher's best-selling digital manga from July 1, 2014, to June 30, 2015; it won the same award in its 2021 edition, which went to the publisher's best-selling digital manga from January 1 to December 31, 2021.

In March 2017, Michael Gombos, Dark Horse Comics' director of international publishing and licensing, reported that Berserk was their best-selling product of all time (not just among manga), dethroning Lone Wolf and Cub, and it had over 2 million copies sold in North America by September 2018. By February 2026, the series had sold over 10 million copies in English. Following the announcement of Miura's death in May 2021, it was reported that the first eight volumes of Dark Horse's deluxe edition of Berserk ranked on Amazon's top 100 overall best-selling books list. According to ICv2, Berserk was the fourth best-selling manga franchise for the Q4 2021 (September–December) period in the United States, and it was also the tenth "most efficient manga franchise" for retailer bookshelves, based on the website's calculations of which manga franchises had the highest sales per volume. The first volume of Dark Horse's deluxe edition was one of the highest-selling manga volumes of 2022; it was also one of the highest-selling manga volumes of 2023.

=== Critical reception ===
Berserk has received critical acclaim. Reviewing the first volume, Michael Aronson of Manga Life described the series as a striking fusion of medieval barbarism, sorcery, and futuristic technology, blending ghouls, firearms, and gore. He noted that its "beautifully rendered" action and extreme violence would satisfy genre enthusiasts. Publishers Weekly called it a relentless mix of brutal violence and exhilarating action, merging pure fantasy with graphic horror. Grant Goodman of Pop Culture Shock regarded Berserk as a redefinition of fantasy manga storytelling, praising its intricate blend of medieval warfare, magic, and horror. Greg McElhatton of Read About Comics found the series compelling yet difficult to pinpoint, citing its characters, monstrous designs, and cryptic backstory elements as key strengths. Daniel Briscoe of The Fandom Post called the third volume a tragic narrative of hatred and lost innocence, commending Miura's ability to balance emotional depth with visceral brutality.

Satyajit Chetri of Rolling Stone observed that by the fifth volume, Berserk evolved into a poignant exploration of humanity, friendship, and ambition, shifting its focus from violence to character-driven choices. Eduardo M. Chavez of AnimeOnDVD noted that even after many volumes, Berserk retained its shocking intensity and uniqueness. Scott Campbell of Active Anime described the twenty-first volume as both horrifying and captivating, emphasizing its unparalleled narrative and artistic execution. Zac Bertschy of SciFi.com praised the series for its disturbing yet deeply affecting storytelling, recommending it to mature audiences.

In Manga: The Complete Guide, Jason Thompson awarded Berserk four stars, likening it to a blood-soaked sword-and-sorcery epic infused with elements of Clive Barker's Hellraiser. He highlighted its meticulously detailed medieval setting, where fantasy elements emerge with gradual, unsettling horror. Thompson, in a separate review, noted that despite its brutality, the protagonist's remorse lent the story moral weight absent in similar works. For Anime News Network (ANN), he acknowledged the series's shift toward a more conventional fantasy RPG structure, but praised Miura's expansive storytelling and richly developed characters.

Matt Fagaly of Crunchyroll analyzed the Lost Children arc (volumes 14–16) for its subversion of shōnen and shōjo tropes, resulting in a uniquely profound narrative. Carl Kimlinger of ANN compared the thirty-fifth volume's adventure tone to Robert E. Howard's works, noting a slight decline in intensity but still maintaining its appeal. Brittany Vincent of Otaku USA declared Berserk one of the most distinctive Western-style fantasies ever created. Eric Frederiksen of Syfy Wire called it one of manga's darkest yet most emotionally rewarding works. Peter Fobian of Crunchyroll reflected on its deeply personal and artistically transformative journey over three decades.

==== Artwork ====
Critics and readers have consistently praised Miura's artwork in Berserk. Bertschy emphasized how the series's visual execution stood out, particularly noting the masterful cross-hatching techniques and obsessive attention to atmospheric detail. He found the art style reminiscent of 1950s horror comics from EC Comics, perfectly matching the narrative's grim tone, and hailed Miura as both a skilled artist and storyteller. Thompson focused on Miura's precise depictions of medieval architecture and weaponry, while acknowledging occasional stylistic inconsistencies in human figures. McElhatton admitted initial reservations about the art but praised its uniquely disturbing portrayal of supernatural elements. Publishers Weekly identified a distinctive 1980s aesthetic characterized by economical dialogue, dynamic action sequences, and effective use of shadow.

Campbell described the artwork's unprecedented level of detail, comparing its visual impact only to Claymore while maintaining Berserk's singular artistic identity. In his review of volume 27, Campbell further emphasized how the series redefined standards for artistic detail in manga. Yegulalp observed significant artistic evolution, noting that while early volumes appeared unpolished, the artwork achieved remarkable consistency and sophistication by volume eight. Brienza remarked Miura's practice of working without a large team of assistants despite the series's technical demands. (Note: Miura had a few assistants who helped him on Berserk.) In her review for Graphic Novel Reporter, Brienza characterized the artwork as an exquisite erotic-grotesque fusion of Dungeons & Dragons-style high fantasy, noting its broad appeal across genders.

Santos highlighted Miura's sophisticated manipulation of light and shadow to create immersive environments, contrasting this with other artists' tendency to neglect background details. Kimlinger ranked the artwork among manga's most technically accomplished, particularly praising its emotional expressiveness, creature designs, and visceral combat sequences. Chetri compared the surreal visuals to works by M. C. Escher, identifying influences from Hellraiser and H. P. Lovecraft's Cthulhu Mythos. Penilhas emphasized the artwork's consistent quality and powerful emotional conveyance throughout the series. Traub drew parallels between Miura's apocalyptic tableaus and Hieronymus Bosch's paintings, noting the instantly recognizable quality of key visual motifs.

== Legacy ==
Berserk is regarded as one of the greatest and most influential works in both manga and dark fantasy. Peter Fobian, in an essay of the legacy and impact of Berserk, called it a "monolith not only for anime and manga, but also fantasy literature, video games, you name it", comparing its level of influence to Blade Runner, further adding, "it's difficult to imagine what the world might look like without it, and the generations of creators the series inspired."

According to writer and editor Kazushi Shimada, series like Fullmetal Alchemist, Attack on Titan, Demon Slayer: Kimetsu no Yaiba, and Jujutsu Kaisen would not have existed if not for Berserk. Some dark fantasy manga authors who have declared influence from Berserk include Hajime Isayama (Attack on Titan), Kazue Kato (Blue Exorcist), and Yana Toboso (Black Butler). Other authors influenced by Berserk include Makoto Yukimura (Vinland Saga), Yūki Tabata (Black Clover), and Ryōgo Narita (Baccano! and Durarara!!). Adi Shankar, producer of the Castlevania animated series, said in an interview that he would like to adapt Berserk, calling the "hyper-detailed beauty" of Miura's artwork a "true masterpiece", while Adam Deats, Castlevania assistant director, stated that the show was inspired by Berserk.

Critics like Gene Park of The Washington Post and Ramsey Isler of IGN stated that Berserk started a visual trend of characters wielding giant swords that spread to Cloud Strife from Final Fantasy VII, Dante from Devil May Cry, and Ichigo Kurosaki from Bleach.

Berserk has also inspired a number of video games, including the Dynasty Warriors series, the Final Fantasy series (particularly Final Fantasy VII and XIV), FromSoftware's Soulsborne games, (Note: Including the Dark Souls series, Bloodborne, Sekiro: Shadows Die Twice, and Elden Ring.) and Capcom's Devil May Cry and Dragon's Dogma series.

Finnish heavy metal band Battle Beast have written songs about Berserk, including several on their 2013 self-titled album. When guitarist Anton Kabanen left Battle Beast in 2015, he formed Beast in Black and continues to write songs about the series. The deathcore band Brand of Sacrifice released the album God Hand in 2019. Both the band and album are significantly inspired by Berserk. In 2021, deathcore band Slaughter to Prevail released a music video for their song "Zavali Ebalo", which featured scenes from the Berserk 1997 anime series. On August 16, 2025, Chinese label Pest Productions released the compilation tribute album Death Kult Over Black Congregation – Chinese Black Metal Tribute to Miura Kentaro's Berserk.

Online animation group Studio Eclypse announced in October 2023 that it had begun pre-production of a fan animation titled Berserk: The Black Swordsman. The project was slated to premiere in 2025; however, in September 2024, Hakusensha posted a statement indicating that the copyright holder, Kentaro Miura and Studio Gaga, did not authorize its production, and that the videos in the project—including a comparison video between the cuts from Studio Eclypse's trailer and the panels from the original Berserk manga—were used without permission.
