= List of Hajime no Ippo volumes (81–100) =

Hajime no Ippo (はじめの一歩; lit. 'The First Step') is a Japanese boxing manga series written and illustrated by George Morikawa. It has been serialized by Kodansha in Weekly Shōnen Magazine since 1989 and collected in over 137 tankōbon to date. It follows the story of high school student Makunouchi Ippo, as he begins his career in boxing and over time obtains many titles and defeats various opponents.

== Volume list ==
| No. | Japanese release date | Japanese ISBN |
|---|---|---|
| 81 | September 14, 2007 | 978-4-06-363881-3 |
Round 768: "Fixing The Fight Fixer" (八百長の八百長, Yaochō no yaochō); Round 769: "Heavy Money" (重い借金); Round 770: "Open for Business" (仕事開始!); Round 771: "A Casual Down" (余裕のダウン); Round 772: "Magic Show" (魔術Show); Round 773: "Bewitching Glove" (幻惑のグローブ); Round 774: "The Magician's True Strength" (魔術師の本領); Round 775: "The Arm Extends!!" (腕が伸びる!!); Round 776: "The Winner of the Dual Exchanges" (相打ちの勝者); Round 777: "Guns and Gloves" (銃とグローブ)
| 82 | December 17, 2007 | 978-4-06-363922-3 |
Round 778: "Malfunctioning Machine" (狂った機械); Round 779: "Other Than Boxing" (ボクシング以外); Round 780: "Two Things To Remember" (2つの心掛け); Round 781: "These Fists Aren't Heavy" (この拳は重くない); Round 782: "Insane Connection" (あきれた絆); Round 783: "Magic Punch" (魔法のパンチ); Round 784: "Counterattack vs. Counterattack" (反撃Vs. 反撃); Round 785: "Preparing to Enter the Ring" (覚悟のリング); Round 786: "Another Trick" (どんでん返し); Round 787: "I Can See!!" (見える!!)
| 83 | March 17, 2008 | 978-4-06-363946-9 |
Round 788: "Champion's Pride" (王者の誇り一歩の腹攻撃にゲトーダウン); Round 789: "A Fight To Be Proud Of" (誇りある戦い); Round 790: "Hurricane Makunouchi" (幕之内台風); Round 791: "Extreme Talent" (強烈な才能); Round 792: "Go For The Throne!" (Go to 王者); Round 793: "The Shape of Talent" (右の形); Round 794: "King of Speed Kings"; Round 795: "Be Aggressive!" (強引に!); Round 796: "Unexpected Spar" (思わぬスパー); Round 797: "Hi-Speed Perspective" (高速の風景); Round 798: "The Worst Feeling" (最悪の予感)
| 84 | June 17, 2008 | 978-4-06-363994-0 |
Round 799: "The Remaining Round" (1R余ってる); Round 800: "That is Ippo Makunouchi" (あの男がイッポ·マクノウチだ); Round 801: "Right and Left" (右と左); Round 802: "An Enviable Pit" (羨ましいか 気の毒か); Round 803: "The Main Event and the Main Event" (メインイベントとメインイベント); Round 804: "A Higher Level" (上のレベル); Round 805: "Because of Their Meeting" (出会ったが故に); Round 806: "The Unexpected Possibility" (まさかまさか); Hajime No Ippo Gaiden: "Naniwa Tiger" (浪速の虎)
| 85 | September 17, 2008 | 978-4-06-384033-9 |
Round 807: "Beatdown Tour" (どつき旅); Round 808: "Better Off Not Seeing" (観ない方がええわ); Round 809: "Two Strong Willed Men" (強気な2人); Round 810: "Dad's Style" (父さんのスタイル); Round 811: "Full of Weaknesses" (欠点だらけ); Round 812: "Inherited Dream" (継がれた夢); Round 813: "Always Watching" (いつも観ていた); Round 814: "When The Cherry Blossoms Bloom" (桜の咲く頃); Round 815: "Cherry Blossom Memories" (桜の記憶); Round 816: "The Two Champions" (王者2人)
| 86 | December 17, 2008 | 978-4-06-384072-8 |
Round 817: "Strange Atmosphere" (変な雰囲気); Round 818: "KO Sakura" (KO桜); Round 819: "Worse Than a Hard Time" (苦戦どころか); Round 820: "Their Fathers" (それぞれの父); Round 821: "Wild Animals Caged" (猛獣の檻); Round 822: "Deathmatch in the Corner" (死闘のコーナー); Round 823: "The Person I've Chased" (目指すアイツ); Round 824: "The Unstoppable Punch" (無敵のパンチ); Round 825: "World Class" (世界基準); Round 826: "A Cut Man" (キレた男)
| 87 | March 17, 2009 | 978-4-06-384094-0 |
Round 827: "Best In The World" (天下一品, Tenkaippin); Round 828: "Right Jabs" (右ジャブ!, Migi jabu!); Round 829: "Switch" (スウィッチ, Sū~itchi); Round 830: "The Source of the Static" (雑音の正体, Zatsuon no shōtai); Round 831: "Eyes of the Champion" (王者の目, Ōja no me); Round 832: "The Lightning God's Fists" (雷神の拳, Raijin no ken); Round 833: "A Big Deal" (重大なコト, Jūdaina koto); Round 834: "Miyata's Hang Up" (宮田のこだわり, Miyata no kodawari); Round 835: "Payoff Of Courage" (勇気の報酬, Yūki no hōshū); Round 836: "Abnormality" (異変!?, Ihen! ?)
| 88 | June 17, 2009 | 978-4-06-384143-5 |
Round 837: "Asura" (阿修羅・・・・!!); Round 838: "Miyata's Best Friend" (宮田の親友); Round 839: "The Chosen Path" (選んだ道); Round 840: "The Chosen Path (2)" (ボクが―); Round 841: "A Desperate Boxer" (雑なボクサー); Round 842: "The Light" (光明は); Round 843: "No Joke" (冗談じゃないっ); Round 844: "Fist's Memory" (拳の記憶); Round 845: "Genius and Genius" (天才と天才); Round 846: "A New Life!" (新生の時!); Round 847: "Opposite Outcome" (予想の逆)
| 89 | September 17, 2009 | 978-4-06-384180-0 |
Round 848: "Vengeful Takamura" (復讐の鷹村); Round 849: "Sayonara, Sakaguchi" (さらばサカグチ); Round 850: "It was Inspirational!" (刺激になった!); Round 851: "The Fear of Slipping" (滑る恐怖); Round 852: "The Challenge of A's" (挑戦の"A"); Round 853: "The Grim Reaper Returns" (死神、再び); Round 854: "A Dull Challenger" (冴えない挑戦者); Round 855: "Makunouchiiii..." (まくのうち～～っ); Round 856: "The Path of Progress" (積み重ねる道); Round 857: "The Champion of Nature" (大自然の王者)
| 90 | December 17, 2009 | 978-4-06-384219-7 |
Round 858: "The Genius and the Famous Trainer" (天才と名伯楽, Tensai to mei hakuraku); Round 859: "Excitement and Aphorisms" (ウナギと格言); Round 860: "Cumulative Progress" (積み重ねたプラス); Round 861: "International Sparring" (異国での対人練習); Round 862: "Shocking Phone Call" (テレフォン・ショッキング); Round 863: "Reckless Fight" (無謀な試合); Round 864: "Facing the Sun" (太陽との出会い); Round 865: "Higher Upper Class Image" (最上級のイメージ); Round 866: "To the Bone" (骨の髄まで); Round 867: "Inscrutable Hurricane Winds" (冷静なる疾風怒濤); Round 868: "True Form Discovered" (見たかった姿, Mitakatta sugata)
| 91 | March 17, 2010 | 978-4-06-384262-3 |
Round 869: "Instincts Born From Freedom" (自由を得た野生); Round 870: "High Power Frontal Barrage" (猪突猛進); Round 871: "Natural Born" (持って生まれたモノ); Round 872: "Predicted Corner" (予告コーナー); Round 873: "Uncanny Wildness" (驚きの野生); Round 874: "Impossible to Predict" (予測不能); Round 875: "Unquestionable Genius" (紛れもない天才, Magire mo nai tensai); Round 876: "One in a Million" (千載一遇); Round 877: "The Corner is where He´s Most Effective" (コーナーこそが活路); Round 878: "A Future World Champion" (将来の世界王者); Round 879: "Desperate Advance" (愚直な前進)
| 92 | June 17, 2010 | 978-4-06-384309-5 |
Round 880: "As Many Times As It Takes" (何度でも何度でも, Nandodemo nandodemo); Round 881: "The Smiling Boxer" (笑うボクサー); Round 882: "A Small Milestone" (小さな目標); Round 883: "Desired Battle" (望んだ挑戦); Round 884: "Right There...!" (そこにいる・・・・!); Round 885: "The Grim Total" (悲しき積み重ね); Round 886: "Now What!?" (この後どうする!?); Round 887: "No Excuses" (申し訳ない); Round 888: "Desperate Resolution" (怒濤の開き直り); Round 889: "Invisible Hindrance" (見えない足枷); Round 890: "The Wild Child Grounded" (跳べない野生児)
| 93 | September 17, 2010 | 978-4-06-384360-6 |
Round 891: "Traces of Accumulation" (積み重ねの痕, Tsumikasane no ato); Round 892: "Your Specialty" (自分の土俵へ); Round 893: "Trap vs Infinity" (罠vs.∞); Round 894: "He is a Boxer" (これがボクサー); Round 895: "Simply Amazing" (ただ、凄かった); Round 896: "The World's Shining Light" (世界を照らす光に); Round 897: "After The Rumble In The Jungle" (ジャングルでの死闘を終えて); Round 898: "Goal for the Class A Tournament" (A級の目標); Round 899: "The Goal:Makunouchi Ippo" (目標"幕之内一歩"); Round 900: "Little Challenge" (密かな挑戦); Round 901: "High Speed Battle" (ハイスピード・バトル)
| 94 | December 17, 2010 | 978-4-06-384391-0 |
Round 902: "The Genius Accelerates" (加速する天才, Kasoku suru tensai); Round 903: "Shifting Gears" (ギア・チェンジ); Round 904: "Bitter Strategy" (屈辱の戦術); Round 905: "Battle Hardened Class A" (生粋のA級); Round 906: "The Genius' Predicament" (窮地の天才); Round 907: "The Genius Takes Flight" (天才飛翔); Round 908: "Potential Unleashed" (解き放たれた才能); Round 909: "Itagaki's Turn" (板垣の番); Round 910: "The Ecstasy of Progress" (積み重ねの快感); Round 911: "The Distance Between Them" (あの背中までの距離); Round 912: "An 'Imposing' Reunion" ("凄腕"との再会)
| 95 | March 17, 2011 | 978-4-06-384455-9 |
Round 913: "Boy Talk" (ボーイズトーク, Bōizutōku); Round 914: "Date Date Date" (デート・デート・デート, Dēto dēto dēto); Round 915: "Forecast: A Rain of Blood" (血の雨予報, Chi no ame yohō); Round 916: "A Conspicuous Challenger" (8人目の挑戦者, 8 Ninme no chōsen-sha); Round 917: "Looking Down" (見下す男, Mikudasu otoko); Round 918: "Thicken Up!" (太くなれ!, Futoku nare!); Round 919: "Weak, Small, With Bad Punches" (弱い・小さな・パンチもない, Yowai chīsana panchi mo nai); Round 920: "The Challenger's Mystery" (挑戦者の謎, Chōsen-sha no nazo); Round 921: "A Little Too Much" (この人は少し, Kono hito wa sukoshi); Round 922: "Kojima's Weapon" (小島の武器, Kojima no buki); Round 923: "Did I Say That?" (そんなコト言った?, Son'na Koto itta?)
| 96 | June 17, 2011 | 978-4-06-384485-6 |
Round 924: "Chestnuts, Potatoes, and Advice" (クリとイモと助言, Kuri to imo to jogen); Round 925: "Two Methods" (二つの教え, Futatsu no oshie); Round 926: "Unknown Physicality" (未知なる体へ, Michinaru karada e); Round 927: "Loss, Gain, and Their Current Condition" (減量：増量：両者計量, Genryō: Zōryō: Ryōsha keiryō); Round 928: "What Kind of Expression" (どんな表情で, Don'na hyōjō de); Round 929: "Strange Atmosphere" (異様な空気, Iyōna kūki); Round 930: "The Bell's About to Ring" (もうすぐゴング, Mōsugu gongu); Round 931: "Reporting in, With a Smile" (笑顔で報告を, Egao de hōkoku o); Round 932: "The Champion is on His Way to Brawl" (王者、ケンカに行く, Ōja, kenka ni iku); Round 933: "An Abnormal Start" (異様な立ち上がり, Iyōna tachiagari)
| 97 | September 16, 2011 | 978-4-06-384548-8 |
Round 934: "A Stance He Never Learned" (教えていない構え, Oshiete inai kamae); Round 935: "An Unseen Full Swing" (未見の強振, Miken no kyōshin); Round 936: "The Reason He's a Big Mouth" (大口の理由, Ōguchi no riyū); Round 937: "The Ultimate Pattern vs. a Desperate Counter (最強の連撃VS.覚悟の一撃, Saikyō no ren VS. Kakugo no ichigeki); Round 938: "A Critical Masterstroke" (致命的先制打, Chimei-teki sensei-da); Round 939: "Surviving Multiple Hits" (単発なら耐えられる, Tanpatsunara taerareru); Round 940: "The Featherweight Card is Full" (フェザー級は満席, Fezā-kyū wa manseki); Round 941: "A Missed Promise" (すれ違う約束, Surechigau yakusoku); Round 942: "The People's Challenger" (みんなの挑戦者, Min'na no chōsen-sha); Round 943: "A Dream Match in a Bar" (ドリームマッチ in BAR, Dorīmumatchi in bā); Round 944: "Beware a Champion Who Drinks By Himself" (ドリームマッチの結果, Dorīmumatchi no kekka)
| 98 | December 16, 2011 | 978-4-06-384594-5 |
Round 945: "The Key To Unsealing" (封印を解く鍵, Fūinwotoku kagi); Round 946: "Those Without Talent" (才能がない者, Sainō ga nai mono); Round 947: "Ippo's Class A Predictions" (一歩のA級予想, Ippo no A-kyū yosō); Round 948: "What the Trio's Hiding" (3人の隠し事, 3-Nin no kakushigoto); Round 949: "The Reason He Gets Hit" (パンチをもらうワケ, Panchi o morau wake); Round 950: "Deep Rooted Trauma" (植えつけられたトラウマ, Ue tsuke rareta torauma); Round 951: "Kamogawa Gym-Style Therapy" (鴨川ジム流トラウマ克服法, Kamogawa jimu-ryū torauma kokufuku-hō); Round 952: "Before Their Finals" (それぞれの決勝前, Sorezore no kesshō mae); Round 953: "The Itagaki Family's Cheering Method" (板垣家流応援法, Itagaki ieryū ōen-hō); Round 954: "Timespace Invader" (時空間への侵入者, Toki kūkan e no shin'nyū-sha)
| 99 | April 17, 2012 | 978-4-06-384653-9 |
Round 955: "Hedgehog vs Speed Star" (針ねずみVS.スピード・スター, Harinezumi VS. Supīdo sutā); Round 956: "A Barrage of High Speed Flickers" (乱れ撃ち 高速フリッカー, Midare uchi kōsoku furikkā); Round 957: "Performance Test" (マシンの性能比較, Mashin no seinō hikaku); Round 958: "This is Class A" (これぞA級, Korezo A-kyū); Round 959: "A Reason to Sulk" (ヘコんだ理由, Hekonda riyū); Round 960: "Cranking It Up In Round 2" (アゲアゲ2R, Ageage 2 R); Round 961: "Equilibrium Break" (均衡瓦解, Kinkō gakai); Round 962: "The Old Model's Strategy" (旧式のやり方, Kyūshiki no yarikata); Round 963: "Shinoda's Method for Concentrating" (篠田流集中法, Shinoda-ryū shūchū-hō); Round 964: "Shuffle Time" (シャッフル・タイム, Shaffuru taimu); Round 965: "The New Model Accelerates" (新型、加速。, Shingata, kasoku.)
| 100 | July 17, 2012 | 978-4-06-384701-7 |
Round 966: "Shiritori Combinations" (しりとり連続攻撃, Shiri tori renzoku kōgeki); Round 967: "Why He Can Hit Him" (当てられる理由, Ate rareru riyū); Round 968: "The Old Model's Pride" (旧型の意地, Kyūgata no yiji); Round 969: "Final Lap" (ファイナル・ラップ, Fainaru rappu); Round 970: "Red Zone" (レッドゾーン, Reddozōn); Round 971: "Forced Obsolescence" (強制リタイヤ, Kyōsei ritaiya); Round 972: "A Senpai's Dignity" (先輩の貫録, Senpai no kanroku); Round 973: "Big Problems" (問題だらけだぜ, Mondai-darakeda ze); Round 974: "Don't Let Him Live, But Don't Kill Him Either" (生かさず殺さず, Ikasazu korosazu); Round 975: "Bored Now" (飽きちゃったか, Aki chatta ka); Round 976: "The Martial Art Of Boxing" (拳闘道, Kentō michi)
