= List of Hajime no Ippo volumes (41–60) =

Hajime no Ippo (はじめの一歩; lit. 'The First Step') is a Japanese boxing manga series written and illustrated by George Morikawa. It has been serialized by Kodansha in Weekly Shōnen Magazine since 1989 and collected in over 137 tankōbon to date. It follows the story of high school student Makunouchi Ippo, as he begins his career in boxing and over time obtains many titles and defeats various opponents.

== Volume list ==
No.	Japanese release date	Japanese ISBN
41	February 17, 1998	978-4-06-312509-2
Round 362: "Their Ring" (それぞれのリング, Sorezore no ringu); Round 363: "The Pro's Ring" (プロの修羅場, Puro no shuraba); Round 364: "Dark Clouds" (暗雲, An'un); Round 365: "Wild Hawk" (痩せた鷹, Yaseta taka); Round 366: "Bad Feeling" (嫌な予感, Iyanayokan); Round 367: "My Identity" (オレ様の証明, Oresama no shōmei); Round 368: "Fury" (憤激, Fungeki); Round 369: "The Two Wild Ones" (2人の野生児, 2-Ri no yasei-ji); Round 370: "Where I Belong" (居場所, Ibasho)
42	April 17, 1998	978-4-06-312532-0
Round 371: "The Ring, Sweat, Them, and..." (リングと汗とこいつらと, Ringu to ase to koitsu-ra to); Round 372: "Present" (プレゼント, Purezento); Round 373: "Will to Fight" (悶焦の闘志, Mon ase no tōshi); Round 374: "The End to Weight Management" (減量の果てに, Genryō no hate ni); Round 375: "DNA"; Round 376: "Two Cries" (2つのエール, 2Tsu no ēru); Round 377: "Annihilation Request" (殲滅依頼, Senmetsu irai); Round 378: "Those Who Put Out Effort" (努力した者, Doryoku shita mono); Round 379: "Entrance of the Greats" (強者の競宴, Tsuwamono no Kei utage)
43	June 17, 1998	978-4-06-312556-6
Round 380: "Flawless Hawk" (天衣無縫の型, Ten'imuhō no kata); Round 381: "Infinity Punch" (無限のパンチ, Mugen no panchi); Round 382: "The Leader's Responsibility" (指導者の責任, Shidō-sha no sekinin); Round 383: "For This" (世界戦(このとき)のために, Sekai-sen (kono Toki) no tame ni); Round 384: "Practice" (慣れ, Nare); Round 385: "My Left" (ワシの左, Washi no hidari); Round 386: "Weakness" (弱点, Jakuten); Round 387: "Street Fight" (ケンカ拳闘, Kenka kentō); Round 388: "Wild Rhythm" (野生のリズム, Yasei no rizumu)
44	August 17, 1998	978-4-06-312578-8
Round 389: "The Same Engine" (同じエンジン, Onaji enjin); Round 390: "The Law of Street Fighting" (喧嘩(ストリート·ファイト)の掟, Kenka (sutorīto· faito) no okite); Round 391: "Soul Brace" (魂の支柱, Tamashī no shichū); Round 392: "Greatest Second" (最高のセコンド, Saikō no sekondo); Round 393: "License to Kill" (第2の殺人許可証, Dai 2 no satsujin kyoka-shō); Round 394: "Final Task" (最後の仕事, Saigo no shigoto); Round 395: "Unknown Animal" (未知なる野性, Michinaru yasei); Round 396: "10 Count" (カウント10, Kaunto 10); Round 397: "My Coronation" (オレ様流戴冠式, Oresama-ryū taikanshiki)
45	November 17, 1998	978-4-06-312616-7
Round 398: "Champion Commemoration Sale" (王座奪取記念セール, Ōza dasshu kinen sēru); Round 399: "Delicious Moment" (おいしい瞬間, Oishī shunkan); Round 400: "Long Time Ago"; Round 401: "'Prize Fighting' and 'Boxing'" (「拳闘」と「ボクシング」, `Kentō' to `bokushingu'); Round 402: "Curious Cohabitation" (奇妙な共同生活, Kimyōna kyōdō seikatsu); Round 403: "Neko-chan the Rickshaw Driver" (リンタク屋猫ちゃん, Rintaku-ya neko-chan); Round 404: "He's My Best Friend" (アイツは親友, Aitsu wa shin'yū); Round 405: "Drunken Fist" (酔った拳, Yotta ken); Round 406: "Razor Nekota" (カミソリ猫田, Kamisori nekota)
46	January 14, 1999	978-4-06-312640-2
Round 407: "Instantaneous Light" (刹那の灯, Setsuna no akari); Round 408: "Tekken" (鉄拳, Tekken); Round 409: "The Spirit Behind One Punch" (一撃闘魂, Ichigeki tōkon); Round 410: "Painful Spirit" (痛すぎる気合い, Ita sugiru kiai); Round 411: "The Weapon Called Courage" (勇気という名の武器, Yūki to iu na no buki); Round 412: "Willpower of a Man" (男たる意地, Otokotaru yiji); Round 413: "Blood of a Samurai" (サムライの血, Samurainochi); Round 414: "The Promised Fist" (約束の拳, Yakusoku no ken); Round 415: "The Itagaki Household" (板垣家の人々\Itagaki-ka no hitobito)
47	April 16, 1999	978-4-06-312673-0
Round 416: "Unclear Goal" (霞んだ目標, Kasunda mokuhyō); Round 417: "The Strongest and Worst Weapon" (最強かつ最悪の武器, Saikyō katsu saiaku no buki); Round 418: "Dempsey Destruction" (デンプシー破り, Denpushī-yaburi); Round 419: "Similar Fighter" (同一型ファイター, Dō ichi-gata faitā); Round 420: "Challenge the Era" (時代への挑戦, Jidai e no chōsen); Round 421: "Pure-Blooded Infighter" (純血のインファイター, Junketsu no infaitā); Round 422: "Seaman Interview" (海人(ウミンチュ)ご対面, Ama (uminchu) go taimen); Round 423: "Super Muscle Recovery" (肉体超回復, Nikutai chō kaifuku); Round 424: "Ultimate Punch" (究極のパンチ, Kyūkyoku no panchi)
48	June 17, 1999	978-4-06-312697-6
Round 425: "Expression of a Challenger" (挑戦者の表情, Chōsen-sha no hyōjō); Round 426: "The Navigation Begins" (潜行開始, Senkō kaishi); Round 427: "In, Out, and..." (インとアウトと, In to auto to); Round 428: "Inexperienced Distance" (不慣れな距離, Funarena kyori); Round 429: "Zero-Distance Battle" (距離ゼロの戦闘, Kyori zero no sentō); Round 430: "Swimming in the Sea" (戻れぬ海, Modorenu umi); Round 431: "Bottom of the Sea" (海底, Kaitei); Round 432: "Endless Road Under the Sea" (深海の無限軌道, Shinkai no mugen kidō); Round 433: "Rotation, Ended" (回転、止まる, Kaiten, tomaru)
49	August 17, 1999	978-4-06-312723-2
Round 434: "Lack of Oxygen" (酸素負債); Round 435: "Fight With a Smile" (笑顔のファイト); Round 436: "Unconscious Pursuit" (無心の追撃); Round 437: "Boxer"; Round 438: "Upper-Half's Fighting Spirit" (半身の闘魂); Round 439: "Path of Life" (生きる道); Round 440: "Much Ado About Nothing By the Bedside" (枕もとのからさわぎ); Round 441: "Person to Give Me Strength" (力をくれる人); Round 442: "The Feelings of a Man on the Verge" (スレスレの気持ち)
50	October 15, 1999	978-4-06-312744-7
Round 443: "Small Frog's New Arsenal" (アマガエルの新兵器); Round 444: "Boxer's Disqualification" (ボクサー失格); Round 445: "Scientist vs Hardworker" (研究家vs努力家); Round 446: "Goddess of Victory" (勝利の女神); Round 447: "Sixth Stage" (6年目の晴れ舞台); Round 448: "Special Seal" (変則封じ, Hensoku fūji); Round 449: "Frog's Scar" (カエルの爪痕, Kaeru no tsumeato); Round 450: "Doubtful Composition" (迷いの構図, Mayoi no kōzu); Round 451: "Patience" (辛抱, Shinbō); Round 452: "Lies or Truths?" (嘘か真実か, Uso ka shinjitsu ka)
51	February 17, 2000	978-4-06-312799-7
Round 453: "The Dreams of a Man Who Can't Fly" (飛べない男の夢); Round 454: "Giant Gamble" (大博打); Round 455: "100% Feint" (100%のフェイク); Round 456: "Conclusive Difference" (決定的な差); Round 457: "Man & Woman"; Round 458: "Muddy Tenacity" (泥だらけの執念); Round 459: "Distance to Glory" (栄光までの距離); Round 460: "What I Wanted" (欲しかったモノ); Round 461: "The Path of the Boxer" (ボクサーの道); Round 462: "Clumsy Technique" (無様な技)
52	May 17, 2000	978-4-06-312837-6
Round 463: "A Huge Announcement" (重大発表); Round 464: "The Champ's Treachery" (秘策の王様); Round 465: "Cheese Champion" (チーズチャンピオン); Round 466: "Malicious Boxing" (悪性ボクサー); Round 467: "Bloodthirsty Mad Dog" (餓えた狂犬); Round 468: "Theory of Dempsey Evolution" (最終兵器進化論); Round 469: "Itagaki's Research Report" (板垣緊急レポート); Round 470: "Fear from the Blind Spot" (無角の恐怖); Round 471: "The Owari Dragon" (尾張の竜); Round 472: "Agony and Loneliness" (屈折と孤独と)
53	July 17, 2000	978-4-06-312857-4
Round 473: "Volg the Guest" (客人·ヴォルグ); Round 474: "Volg's Challenge" (ヴォルグの挑戦); Round 475: "Sawamura's Scenario" (悪魔のシナリオ); Round 476: "A Heavy Parting Gift" (重い置き土産); Round 477: "Dempsey Evolution" (デンプシーの進化); Round 478: "Face of Determination" (決断の表情); Round 479: "Inside the Ring" (リングの中で); Round 480: "Ippo's Malaise" (違和感の一歩); Round 481: "Heroes and Villains" (英雄と奸雄); Round 482: "Raging Fists" (怒りの拳)
54	September 14, 2000	978-4-06-312879-6
Round 483: "Sawamura's Mistake" (沢村の誤算); Round 484: "Intrepid Challenger" (不敵な挑戦者); Round 485: "True Form" (本当の姿); Round 486: "'Bullet'" ("弾丸(バレット)"); Round 487: "Makunouchi Destruction" (幕之内殺し); Round 488: "Explosive Lightning" (衝撃の閃光); Round 489: "How Lightning Strikes" (閃光のカラクリ); Round 490: "The Rolling Champion" (振り子の王者); Round 491: "The Spice of Patience" (我慢の味付); Round 492: "The Complete Dempsey Counter" (完全なるデンプシー破り)
55	December 15, 2000	978-4-06-312911-3
Round 493: "A Joyous Feast" (歓喜の謝肉祭); Round 494: "To Continue Fighting" (もっと勝負を); Round 495: "The Reason for Not Falling" (倒れない理由); Round 496: "The Reasonable Gamble" (根拠強き賭け(ギャンブル)); Round 497: "∞ Potential" (∞(無限)の可能性); Round 498: "Curses vs. Cheers" (応援VS怨念); Round 499: "Training for Trouble" (ピンチの練習); Round 500: "Springing Timing" (揺れる勝負処(タイミング)); Round 501: "A Counter Destroyer" (凶悪なカウンター潰し); Round 502: "Life-Saving Fists" (活人の拳)
56	March 16, 2001	978-4-06-312944-1
Round 503: "Memories of the Hat" (帽子の思い出); Round 504: "Strength to Live" (生きる強さ); Round 505: "Place of Destination" (辿り着きたい場所); Round 506: "Umezawa-kun's Reconciliation" (梅沢君のケジメ); Round 507: "Powerful Words" (力の出る言葉); Round 508: "'Makunouchi Fishing' Gym" (「釣り船幕の内」ジム); Round 509: "The Greatest Goal" (最高の目標); Round 510: "Look Out! Makunouchi Fishing!!" (風雲!釣り船幕の内!!); Round 511: "Incident at Kamogawa Gym" (鴨川戦線異常アリ); Round 512: "Imai Shock" (今井shock)
57	June 15, 2001	978-4-06-312978-6
Round 513: "A Boxer's Pitch" (ボクサーの音色); Round 514: "A Weak Counter" (貧弱なカウンター); Round 515: "Certain Suspicions" (ある種の疑惑); Round 516: "The Worst 'Mosquito'" (最悪の蚊); Round 517: "Sanada's Advice" (真田の助言); Round 518: "Duty to Deny the World Title Match" (世界戦没収責任); Round 519: "Hawk's Eye" (鷹の目); Round 520: "World Title Match Shakedown" (踊る大世界戦); Round 521: "Like a Pro" (プロの顔); Round 522: "Golden Eagle" (黄金の鷲(ゴールデンイーグル))
58	September 17, 2001	978-4-06-313017-1
Round 523: "Mamoru Takamura" (マモル·タカムラ); Round 524: "My Arena" (オレ様の舞台); Round 525: "Arena Debut" (大会場(アリーナ)デビュー); Round 526: "Kimura's Bittersweet Symphony" (木村狂想曲); Round 527: "Papaya's True Form" (パパイヤの正体); Round 528: "Shady Fighter Vs Shady Fighter" (曲者対曲者); Round 529: "Measurement for Surpassing Limits" (限界を超えた速度); Round 530: "Expressive Fists" (語る拳); Round 531: "Pride as a Boxer" (ボクサーとしての誇り); Round 532: "Nearly Complete Improved Counter" (未完の新型カウンター)
59	December 17, 2001	978-4-06-313051-5
Round 533: "The Main Event Arrives" (真打登場); Round 534: "Hawk vs. Eagle" (鷹対鷲); Round 535: "Prelude to War" (激戦の序曲); Round 536: "An Ominous Pressure" (不気味な重圧(プレッシャー)); Round 537: "Precision Boxing" (精巧無比のボクシング); Round 538: "The Watchful Eagle Eye" (見つめる鷲の目(イーグルズ·アイ)); Round 539: "Frustration" (フラストレーション); Round 540: "Wildness Vs Discipline" (野性対理性); Round 541: "Hawk in a Cage" (閉じこめられた鷹)
60	February 15, 2002	978-4-06-313072-0
Round 542: "Invisible Damage" (見えないダメージ); Round 543: "The Range of No Escape" (逃げ切れない距離); Round 544: "Exceptional Warfare" (想像を超えた戦術); Round 545: "Hunting Hawk" (襲いかかる鷹); Round 546: "Unforgettable Lessons" (忘れられない教え); Round 547: "Worst Case Scenario" (最悪の事態); Round 548: "Increasing Unease" (増幅する不安); Round 549: "A Coincidental Event" (皮肉な展開); Round 550: "Bloodstained Attack" (血まみれの猛攻); Round 551: "Collision of Skill and Strength" (力と技の激突)
