= List of Hajime no Ippo volumes (61–80) =

Hajime no Ippo (はじめの一歩; lit. 'The First Step') is a Japanese boxing manga series written and illustrated by George Morikawa. It has been serialized by Kodansha in Weekly Shōnen Magazine since 1989 and collected in over 137 tankōbon to date. It follows the story of high school student Makunouchi Ippo, as he begins his career in boxing and over time obtains many titles and defeats various opponents.

== Volume list ==
No.	Japanese release date	Japanese ISBN
61	17 May 2002	978-4-06-363103-6
Round 552: "Combatant's Heated Feelings" (両雄の熱き思い, Ryōyū no atsuki omoi); Round 553: "Blood Soaked Battle" (血まみれの戦い, Chimamire no tatakai); Round 554: "Beyond a Death Match" (死闘の果てに, Shitōnohateni); Round 555: "A Hard-Won Victory" (努力の勝利, Doryoku no shōri); Round 556: "Lingering Victory" (勝利の余韻, Shōri no yoin); Round 557: "World's Greatest Surrogate Son" (世界一の孝行息子, Sekaiichi no kōkō musuko); Round 558: "A Star Is Born" (スター誕生, Sutā tanjō); Round 559: "Itagaki's Resolve" (板垣の決意, Itagaki no ketsui); Round 560: "Course of Destiny" (因縁の図式, In'nen no zushiki); Round 561: "The Spar's Results" (スパーの収穫, Supā no shūkaku)
62	17 September 2002	978-4-06-363143-2
Round 562: "The Man Who Shattered His Confidence" (自信を打ち砕いた男, Jishin o uchikudaita otoko); Round 563: "Heart of the Underdog" (雑草の心意気, Zassō no kokoroiki); Round 564: "Motivation to Win" (勝ちにこだわる理由(わけ), Kachi ni kodawaru riyū (wake)); Round 565: "Naturally Gifted" (生まれ持ったモノ, Umare motta mono); Round 566: "The Unfilled Gap" (埋まらない差, Umaranai-sa); Round 567: "Intense Feelings of a Dark Horse" (雑草の切なる思い, Zassō no setsunaru omoi); Round 568: "When His Spirit Breaks" (心が折れる時, Kokorogaoreru-toki); Round 569: "A Dark Horse Who Grew Straight Up" (まっすぐにのびた雑草, Massugu ni nobita zassō); Round 570: "Proof of Being a Pro Boxer" (プロボクサーの証, Purobokusā no akashi); Round 571: "Words That Can't Be Said Yet" (今はまだ言えない言葉, Ima wa mada ienaikotoba); Round 572: "Dempsey Roll Under Siege" (デンプシー·ロール包囲網, Denpushī· rōru hōi-mō)
63	17 December 2002	978-4-06-363176-0
Round 573: "A Luxurious Gift" (ぜいたくな買い物, Zeitakuna kaimono); Round 574: "Severe Training" (苛烈な練習, Karetsuna renshū); Round 575: "Beyond the Evolution of the Dempsey Roll" (デンプシー進化の先に, Denpushī shinka no saki ni); Round 576: "Something I Want to Try" (やっておきたいこと, Yatte okitai koto); Round 577: "A Place to Reflect" (立ち返るところ, Tachikaeru tokoro); Round 578: "The Neverending Journey?" (明日なき放浪?, Ashita naki hōrō?); Round 579: "Something's Missing" (足りないなにか, Tarinai nani ka); Round 580: "Before the Fight" (戦いの前, Tatakai no mae); Round 581: "The Challenger's Excitement" (挑戦者の高ぶり, Chōsen-sha no takaburi); Round 582: "Champion on the Attack" (迫りくる王者, Semari kuru ōja); Round 583: "Karasawa in the Palm of His Hand" (掌の上の唐沢, Tenohira no ue no Karasawa)
64	17 March 2003	978-4-06-363211-8
Round 584: "The Remaining 30 Seconds" (残り30秒); Round 585: "Ippo's Focus" (一歩の課題); Round 586: "The One Controlling the Pace" (試合を支配(コントロール)する者); Round 587: "A Distorted Orbit" (いびつな円軌道); Round 588: "Premonition of Progress" (成長の予感); Round 589: "The Final Counterattack" (最後の逆襲); Round 590: "Light and Darkness in the Ring" (リング上の明暗); Round 591: "Seal on the Finishing Blow" (必殺技の封印); Round 592: "What He'll Soon Realize" (後に気づくこと); Round 593: "Battle for Dominance" (覇権争い); Round 594: "Love Pentagon" (五角関係)
65	17 June 2003	978-4-06-363246-0
Round 595: "Dead End" (袋小路); Round 596: "A Definitive Deficiency" (決定的な欠陥); Round 597: "Be Ready For Anything" (腹をくくれ); Round 598: "Itagaki's choice" (板垣の選択); Round 599: "Speed Vs Power" (速度(スピード) VS. 豪腕(パワー)); Round 600: "Beat the Pressure" (重圧をはねのけろ); Round 601: "A Close Range Offensive" (至近距離の攻防); Round 602: "Go-Go Mode" (行け行けモード); Round 603: "Stepping Forward on His Own" (自分から前へ); Round 604: "A Man of Valor's View" (勇者の視界); Round 605: "Boxing High" (ボクシングハイ)
66	17 September 2003	978-4-06-363284-2
Round 606: "With Alarming Speed" (恐ろしい速度(スピード)で); Round 607: "A Pro Boxer" (プロのボクサー); Round 608: "A Heavy Hitter's Methodology" (強打者の理論); Round 609: "Fearsome Destructive Power" (恐るべき破壊力); Round 610: "Such Unfair Boxing" (理不尽なボクシング); Round 611: "The Trainer's Words" (篠田(トレーナー)の言葉); Round 612: "Their Choices" (二人の選択); Round 613: "Visions of My Senpai" (先輩たちの姿); Round 614: "What Ippo Can Do" (一歩にできること); Round 615: "Within Fading Consciousness" (薄れゆく意識のなかで); Round 616: "The Difference Between Them" (今井と板垣の差)
67	17 December 2003	978-4-06-363315-3
Round 617: "What He's Seen" (見てきたモノ); Round 618: "Itagaki's Pride" (板垣の誇り); Round 619: "End of the Duel" (死闘の決着); Round 620: "Recipients of Victory and Defeat" (勝敗を分けたもの); Round 621: "West Japan Rookie King" (西日本新人王); Round 622: "The One Who's Waiting" (待っている人); Round 623: "The Promised Place" (約束の地); Round 624: "Rival" (好敵手(ライバル)); Round 625: "Kamogawa Gym's Official Recognition" (鴨川ジム公式採用); Round 626: "The Schedule from Now On" (これからの日程(スケジュール)); Round 627: "This Time for Sure..." (今度こそ)
68	16 April 2004	978-4-06-363355-9
Round 628: "Itagaki Returns" (板垣帰還); Round 629: "Baton Pass" (バトンタッチ); Round 630: "22 Wins, 10 Losses, 1 Draw" (22勝10敗1分); Round 631: "The Boxer He Didn't Want to Fight" (戦いたくなかった選手(ボクサー)); Round 632: "Disappearances" (見えなくなっていたモノ); Round 633: "True Form" (本来の姿); Round 634: "Straight Eyes" (まっすぐな眼); Round 635: "The Veteran Challenger" (ベテラン挑戦者); Round 636: "The Challenger's Greeting" (挑戦者の挨拶); Round 637: "Specialty" (本領発揮)
69	15 July 2004	978-4-06-363396-2
Round 638: "Where the Weakness Is" (弱点はどこに); Round 639: "Confused Depth Perception" (狂う距離感); Round 640: "Special Distance" (得意の距離); Round 641: "Poisonous Fangs" (毒の牙); Round 642: "Power Struggle" (破壊力勝負); Round 643: "Familiar Scene" (見慣れぬ光景); Round 644: "The Invincible Challenger" (不死身の挑戦者); Round 645: "What Take is Doing" (武のやっていること); Round 646: "Ominous Form" (不吉な影); Round 647: "Tightly Bound" (がんじがらめ); Round 648: "Same Position" (同じ条件)
70	17 September 2004	978-4-06-363428-0
Round 649: "Fighting Head On" (真つ向勝負); Round 650: "The Fearless Challenger" (臆さぬ挑戦者); Round 651: "Going Past the Limits" (限界を超えて); Round 652: "Weakling" (弱虫); Round 653: "The Finishing Blow" (フィニッシュ・ブロー); Round 654: "Ruthless Right Hook" (無情の右フック); Round 655: "Father's Back" (父親の背中); Round 656: "The Bridge to Tomorrow" (明日につながるモン); Round 657: "What's Ahead For Everyone" (それぞれの"次"); Round 658: "The Girl, Her Brother, & My Rival" (彼女と兄とライバルと)
71	17 December 2004	978-4-06-363458-7
Round 659: "Spoiled Brat" (甘ちゃん); Round 660: "Anti-Makunouchi Plan" (幕之内対策); Round 661: "The Enemy Outside the Ring" (リングの外の敵); Round 662: "The Wingless Champion" (翼をもがれた王者); Round 663: "Rusted Blade" (錆びついた刀); Round 664: "The Worst Match Ever" (最低の試合); Round 665: "The Match We Promised" (約束の試合); Round 666: "Inescapable Destiny" (逃れられぬ運命); Round 667: "One More Card" (もう一つの試合); Round 668: "Conquered Weakness!?" (弱点克服!?); Round 669: "An Idiot's Endeavor" (バカのひとつ覚え)
72	17 March 2005	978-4-06-363495-2
Round 670: "The Comeback Kid" (逆転の貴公子); Round 671: "Aoki the Mastermind" (策士・青木); Round 672: "A Vast, Distant World" (広く遠い世界); Round 673: "Killer Instinct Once Again" (殺意再び); Round 674: "Mashiba's Real Goal" (真柴の真意); Round 675: "A Bad Feeling" (悪い胸騒ぎ); Round 676: "Before the Storm" (嵐の前の); Round 677: "Heavy Atmosphere" (重い空気); Round 678: "Checking Things Out" (様子見); Round 679: "A Means to Close In" (近づく術)
73	17 July 2005	978-4-06-363548-5
Round 680: "Flying Fists" (乱れ飛ぶ拳); Round 681: "Contention of Power" (実力拮抗); Round 682: "Nice Fight" (ナイスファイト); Round 683: "Fury" (怒り); Round 684: "Rhythm of the Motion" (振り子のリズム); Round 685: "Makunouchi's Teachings" (幕之内の教え); Round 686: "Ineffective Knuckles" (効かない拳); Round 687: "Pride" (自尊心); Round 688: "The Wounded Champion" (手負いの王者); Round 689: "Good and Evil" (正義と悪); Round 690: "The Worst Match" (最悪の試合); Round 691: "Survival" (サバイバル)
74	16 December 2005	978-4-06-363606-2
Round 692: "The Same View" (同じ景色を); Round 693: "Death Sentence Executed" (死刑執行); Round 694: "The Final Attack" (最後の一撃); Round 695: "A Battle Beyond Fists" (拳を越えた勝負); Round 696: "Instinct" (本能); Round 697: "A Ring With No Winner" (勝者のいないリング); Round 698: "Championship Belt" (チャンピオンベルト); Round 699: "Final Appearance" (最後の姿); Round 700: "Disturbance at Kamogawa Gym" (鴨川ジム異変); Round 701: "Former Little Leaguers" (元野球少年); Round 702: "An Unexpected Weakness" (思わぬ弱点); Round 703: "The True Star Appears" (真打ち登場)
75	17 March 2006	978-4-06-363636-9
Round 704: "The End..." (最後はやっぱり); Round 705: "Main Eventer" (メインイベンター); Round 706: "Sendo's Goal" (千堂の標的); Round 707: "Pressing the Wrong Buttons" (ボタンのかけちがい); Round 708: "The Next Point?" (次は何点?); Round 709: "Rushed Feelings" (逸る気持ち); Round 710: "Mutual Feelings" (相思相愛); Round 711: "Next Goal" (次の目標); Round 712: "Shinoda's Decision" (篠田の決意); Round 713: "An Anxious Ten Rounds" (迷いだらけの10回戦)
76	16 June 2006	978-4-06-363665-9
Round 714: "Different Techniques" (違う時間軸); Round 715: "Ability Unleashed" (能力開放); Round 716: "Withstand One Hit" (一発を耐えて); Round 717: "Debut Match" (デビュー戦); Round 718: "The Secret of Their Strength" (強さの秘密); Round 719: "Aoki's Revenge" (青木の復讐); Round 720: "Last Match" (最後の試合); Round 721: "Fate" (縁); Round 722: "Untold Reason" (語られる理由); Round 723: "For What Reason" (なんのために)
77	17 August 2006	978-4-06-363705-2
Round 724: "Deep Hole" (深い穴); Round 725: "The Weight of Fists" (拳の重み); Round 726: "A Different Route" (違うルート); Round 727: "Scrarred Jimmy" (傷物ジミー); Round 728: "The Fist of God" (神の一撃); Round 729: "Disrupt the Startup" (出鼻を挫け); Round 730: "Gamble or Threat" (博奕か威嚇か); Round 731: "Tornado" (竜巻); Round 732: "Only One Thing" (やることは一つ); Round 733: "Half-Hearted Punches" (疑心暗鬼); Round 734: "Unfamiliar Fight" (未体験の戦い)
78	17 November 2006	978-4-06-363742-7
Round 735: "Rock vs. Rock" (グーとグー); Round 736: "Chance for Victory" (勝機); Round 737: "The Pursuit of Evolution" (進化の兆し); Round 738: "Gaze Upon God!" (神の姿を見よ); Round 739: "What He Saw..." (見えたのは・・・・); Round 740: "The God Above the Ring" (リング上の神); Round 741: "To Miyata-kun" (宮田くんへ); Round 742: "Zoo"; Round 743: "Fist of the King" (王の姿); Round 744: "Secret Blow: Beetle's Uppercut" (秘打・ビートルズアッペー); Round 745: "The Weight of Those Fists" (その拳の重み)
79	16 February 2007	978-4-06-363786-1
Round 746: "Look Up at the Lightning" (仰ぎ見る、紫電, Aogi miru, shiden); Round 747: "A Piercing Counter" (貫くカウンター, Tsuranuku kauntā); Round 748: "Miyata's Aim" (宮田の狙い, Miyata no nerai); Round 749: "A Message from Miyata" (宮田からの伝言, Miyata kara no dengon); Round 750: "Conspiracy" (陰謀, Inbō); Round 751: "The Destined Boxer" (運命の選手, Unmei no senshu); Round 752: "Racoon Boy" (ラクーン・ボーイ, Rakūn bōi); Round 753: "As the Challenger" (挑戦者として, Chōsen-sha to shite); Round 754: "In The Middle of the Dream" (夢、半ば, Yume, nakaba); Round 755: "Red Blue Yellow" (赤・青・黄, Aka ao kiro); Round 756: "The Mysterious Trainer" (謎のトレーナー, Nazo no torēnā)
80	17 May 2007	978-4-06-363827-1
Round 757: "Seeking It With Him" (あの人と目指す, Ano hito to mezasu); Round 758: "The Man Known as the Magician" (魔術師と呼ばれる男, Majutsu-shi to yoba reru otoko); Round 759: "Dojo Challenge" (道場破り, Dōjōyaburi); Round 760: "Magic Inside the Ring" (リングの魔術, Ringu no majutsu); Round 761: "Nature of the Magic" (魔術の正体, Majutsu no shōtai); Round 762: "Extending? Shrinking?" (伸びる?縮める?, Nobiru? Chidjimeru?); Round 763: "Outside Training" (出稽古, Degeiko); Round 764: "Different From Before" (あの頃とは違う!, Anogoro to wa chigau!); Round 765: "Dual Exchange" (相打ち, Aiuchi); Round 766: "The Other Weakness" (もうひとつの弱点, Mō hitotsu no jakuten); Round 767: "A Fight or a Job" (勝負か仕事か, Shōbu ka shigoto ka)
