= List of Hajime no Ippo volumes (101–120) =

Hajime no Ippo (はじめの一歩; lit. 'The First Step') is a Japanese boxing manga series written and illustrated by George Morikawa. It has been serialized by Kodansha in Weekly Shōnen Magazine since 1989 and collected in 137 tankōbon to date. It follows the story of high school student Makunouchi Ippo, as he begins his career in boxing and obtains many titles and defeats various opponents over time.

== Volume list ==
No.	Japanese release date	Japanese ISBN
101	October 17, 2012	978-4-06-384746-8
Round 977: "Turning Point" (分岐点, Bunkiten); Round 978: "It's Up To My Partner" (相棒次第, Aibō Shidai); Round 979: "My Goal" (俺の目標, Ore no Mokuhyō); Round 980: "At the Sushi Belt Restaurant" (くるくる寿司屋にて, Kurukuru Sushi-ya Nite); Round 981: "The World's Beckoning" (世界への誘い, Sekai e no Izanai); Round 982: "A Step Towards the World" (世界への第一歩, Sekai e no Daiippo); Round 983: "Sendo's Rules" (千堂ルール, Sendō Rūru); Round 984: "The Wolf Stalks Glory" (狼、頂へ, Ōkami, Itadaki e); Round 985: "The White Fang Returns" (白い牙再び, Shiroi Kiba Futatabi); Round 986: "World Class" (これが世界, Kore ga Sekai); Round 987: "The Wolf, Hunted" (狩られる狼, Karareru Ōkami); Round 988: "Freedom or Trials" (自由か試練か, Jiyū ka Shiren ka)
102	January 17, 2013	978-4-06-384796-3
Round 989: "The Lone Wolf's Place of Dying" (弧狼の死に場所, Korō no Shi ni Basho); Round 990: "Their Strength" (念の力, Nen no Chikara); Round 991: "The Return of the Swallow" (逆襲の燕, Gyakushū no Tsubame); Round 992: "World Class Battle" (世界水準の攻防, Sekai Suijun no Kōbō); Round 993: "Exchanges at the World Level" (世界レベルの引き出し, Sekai Reberu no Hikidashi); Round 994: "Foresight and Reaction" (予測と対応, Yosoku to Taiō); Round 995: "High Level Information Warfare" (高度情報戦, Kōdo Jōhō-sen); Round 996: "Life and Death in the Ring" (ロープ際の死線, Rōpu Giwa no Shisen); Round 997: "Eagle's Curiosity" (イーグル、気になる, Īguru, Ki ni Naru); Round 998: "Checkmate" (チェックメイト, Chekkumeito); Round 999: "The Only Chance" (勝機のありか, Shōki no Ari ka); Round 1000: "The Soul of a Wolf" (狼の心根, Ōkami no Kokorone)
103	May 17, 2013	978-4-06-384842-7
Round 1001: "Wolf's Charge" (狼 特攻。, Ōkami Tokkō.); Round 1002: "Unbroken Fang" (牙は折れない, Kiba wa Orenai); Round 1003: "Guard Breaker" (ガード・ブレイカー, Gādo Bureikā); Round 1004: "Fate of the Wolf" (狼の宿命, Ōkami no Shukumei); Round 1005: "Memories" (追憶, Tsuioku); Round 1006: "The Wolf's Last Battle" (狼、最後の戦い, Ōkami, Saigo no Tatakai); Round 1007: "The White Fang's Destination" (白い牙の行方, Shiroi Kiba no Yukue); Round 1008: "Heated Comrades" (たぎる戦友, Tagiru Sen'yū); Round 1009: "Before Taking On The World" (世界へ向かう前に, Sekai e Mukau Mae ni); Round 1010: "Cooking Fish Made Easy" (お魚簡単クッキング, Osakana Kantan Kukkingu); Round 1011: "Weaker" (弱くなったんだ, Yowaku Natta'nda)
104	August 16, 2013	978-4-06-394906-3
Round 1012: "Everyone's Next Round" (それぞれの次戦, Sorezore no Ji-sen); Round 1013: "Cocked and Ready" (ガチンロ, Gachinro); Round 1014: "The Man Who Knows Ricardo Martinez" (リカルド・マルチネスを知る男, Rikarudo Maruchinesu o Shiru Otoko); Round 1015: "Incarnation of Machismo" (マチスモの体現者, Machisumo no Taigen-sha); Round 1016: "Machismo vs. Earnestness" (マチスモVS.愚直, Machisumo VS. Guchoku); Round 1017: "More Than a Knockoff" (模倣を超えた男, Mohō o Koeta Otoko); Round 1018: "Signs of Increase" (上昇気配, Jōshō Kehai); Round 1019: "Close Encounter" (接近遭遇, Sekkin Sōgū); Round 1020: "Those Words" (あの言菜は, Ano Koto Na wa); Round 1021: "A Nation's Hopes" (国民の期待を背負い, Kokumin no Kitai o Seoi)
105	November 15, 2013	978-4-06-394961-2
Round 1022: "A New Game" (新たなる異名, Aratanaru Imyō); Round 1023: "A Grudge Renewed" (因縁再度, In'nen Saido); Round 1024: "I Know You" (俺は知ってるぞ, Ore wa Shitteruzo); Round 1025: "As Long As My Head's Clear" (頭さえ冴えてれば, Atama sae Sae Tereba); Round 1026: "Grind" (ゴリッ, Gorī); Round 1027: "A Visible Inevitability" (可視で不可避, Kashi de Fukahi); Round 1028: "Heir to the Throne" (継ぐ者, Tsugu Mono); Round 1029: "Arrival of a New Era" (新時代の到来, Shin Jidai no Tōrai); Round 1030: "Witness to History" (歴史の証人, Rekishi no Shōnin); Round 1031: "The Wind God's Challenge" (風神、挑戦, Fūjin, Chōsen); Round 1032: "A Mexican God" (メキシコの神, Mekishiko no Kami)
106	February 17, 2014	978-4-06-395008-3
Round 1033: "Mexican Left" (メキシカンの左, Mekishikan no Hidari); Round 1034: "Step by Step" (ずかずかと, Zukazuka to); Round 1035: "Impressions After First Contact" (ファーストコンタクトの感想, Fāsutokontakuto no Kansō); Round 1036: "Standards of the World" (世界標準, Sekai Hyōjun); Round 1037: "What Makes Him Strong" (彼を強くしたモノ, Kare o Tsuyoku Shita Mono); Round 1038: "Aim to Close In" (狙う接近, Nerau Sekkin); Round 1039: "Dodge, Duck, and Dive In" (よけてくぐってすぐ, Yo kete Kugutte Sugu); Round 1040: "What's Hidden?" (隠しているのは, Kakushite Iru no wa); Round 1041: "Threat to the World" (世界威嚇態勢, Sekai Ikaku Taisei); Round 1042: "How to Deal with the Second Arrow" (隠し矢への対策, Kakushi Ya e no Taisaku); Round 1043: "Penetrating Arrow" (穿つ矢, Ugatsu Ya); Round 1044: "Super Close Range Punching Match" (超至近距離打撃戦, Chō Shikin Kyori Dageki-sen)
107	June 17, 2014	978-4-06-395075-5
Round 1045: "Feedback, Confidence" (手応え、確信, Tegotae, Kakushin); Round 1046: "Stepping Towards Glory" (頂きへの踏み込み, Itadaki e no Fumikomi); Round 1047: "An Irritating Advance" (忌々しい前進, Imaimashī Zenshin); Round 1048: "Inevitable Result" (必然の産物, Hitsuzen no Sanbutsu); Round 1049: "Not Knowing" (わからなくなる, Wakaranaku Naru); Round 1050: "From Beyond Consciousness" (意識の外から, Ishiki no Soto Kara); Round 1051: "The Enemy's Name is Confusion" (敵の名は混乱, Teki no Na wa Konran); Round 1052: "Unable To Reach the World!?" (世界には届かない!?, Sekai ni wa Todokanai!?); Round 1053: "Trial and Error" (トライ&エラー, Torai & Erā); Round 1054: "Breaking the Seal" (封印解禁, Fūin Kaikin); Round 1055: "Wind God's Collision" (風神突撃, Fūjin Totsugeki); Round 1056: "The Death God Draws Near" (死神肉薄, Shinigami Nikuhaku)
108	September 17, 2014	978-4-06-395185-1
Round 1057: "Reaper in the Grip of Madness" (死神、怒気を振りまいて, Shinigami, Doki o Furimaite); Round 1058: "What is the Final Weapon?" (最後の武器は何だ, Saigo no Buki wa Nanida); Round 1059: "The Wind God's Full Power" (風神全力, Fūjin Zenryoku); Round 1060: "The Wind God, Powerless" (風神通用せず, Fūjin Tsūyō Sezu); Round 1061: "Brain Shock" (脳を揺らせ, Nō o Yurase); Round 1062: "Sense of Accomplishment" (大いなる達成感, Ōinaru Tassei-kan); Round 1063: "Did You See?" (見ててくれましたか, Mitete Kuremashita ka); Round 1064: "What I've Seen" (俺の見てたもの, Ore no Miteta Mono); Round 1065: "Climactic 7th Round" (運命の第7R, Unmei no Dai-7R); Round 1066: "Search for the Light" (光を探せ, Hikari o Sagase); Round 1067: "Root of Unease" (不倒の根源, Futō no Kongen); Round 1068: "The Wind God's Wish" (風神の願い, Fūjin no Negai); Especial recorded: "It's just that." (ちょっと森ました。, Chotto Morimashita.)
109	December 17, 2014	978-4-06-395263-6
Round 1069: "Oblivion" (粉砕, Funsai); Round 1070: "Second Loss" (2敗目, 2-pai-me); Round 1071: "Gonzalez's Certainty" (ゴンザレスの確信, Gonzaresu no Kakushin); Round 1072: "Gonzalez's Night" (ゴンザレスの夜, Gonzaresu no Yoru); Round 1073: "Before the Return" (必ず戻るその前に, Kanarazu Modoru so no Mae ni); Round 1074: "Words of Wisdom from a Senpai" (先輩からのありがたい一言, Senpai kara no Arigatai Hitokoto); Round 1075: "Words of Resolve" (覚悟の一言, Kakugo no Hitokoto); Round 1076: "Awareness" (気づき, Kidzuki); Round 1077: "Starting Over" (一から走り出す, Ichi kara Hashiridasu); Round 1078: "Unseen Heights" (まだ見ぬ高みへ, Mada Minu Takami e); Round 1079: "Line" (線, Sen)
110	April 17, 2015	978-4-06-395372-5
Round 1080: "No Time To Hesitate" (立ち止まってる暇はない, Tachidomatteru Hima Wanai); Round 1081: "A Tiger and a Grim Reaper Share a Room" (同室、虎と死神, Dōshitsu, Tora to Shinigami); Round 1082: "Who Is The Reaper's Enemy?" (死神の敵はどっちだ, Shinigami no Teki wa Dotchida); Round 1083: "The Grim Reaper Struggles" (死神、苦戦, Shinigami, Kusen); Round 1084: "Killing Spears" (死を呼ぶ槍, Shi o Yobu Yari); Round 1085: "The Next Turn" (次の出番は, Tsugi no Deban wa); Round 1086: "The Tiger Hunting Mexicans" (虎のメキシカン狩り, Tora no Mekishikan Kari); Round 1087: "The Prehistoric Tiger" (古の虎, Inishie no Tora); Round 1088: "The Sabertooth Tiger's Weakness" (剣歯虎の弱点, Kenshitora no Jakuten); Round 1089: "Sendo's True Weapon" (千堂、本当の武器, Sendō, Hontō no Buki); Round 1090: "The Tiger's Knuckle Hell" (虎のゲンコツ地獄, Tora no Genkotsu Jigoku)
111	September 17, 2015	978-4-06-395463-0
Round 1091: "Tiger Style" (虎流, Tora-ryū); Round 1092: "Who is His Next Prey?" (次の獲物は誰だ, Tsugi no Emono wa Dareda); Round 1093: "Mental Shape" (心の練り上げ, Kokoro no Neriage); Round 1094: "The Hawk and the Bison" (鷹と猛牛, Taka to Mōushi); Round 1095: "Battle of the Beasts" (大怪獣バトル, Dai-kaijū Batoru); Round 1096: "Bison Tactics" (猛牛の戦術, Mōushi no Senjutsu); Round 1097: "The Bison's Weapon" (猛牛の武器, Mōushi no Buki); Round 1098: "The Hawk's Choice" (鷹の選択, Taka no Sentaku); Round 1099: "Bison's Thoughts" (バイソン、その心, Baison, sono Kokoro); Round 1100: "The Ox's True Power" (猛牛、本領発揮, Mōushi, Honryō Hakki); Round 1101: "Mirrored Bison" (鏡の猛禽, Kagami no Mōkin); Round 1102: "Authentic vs. Hijacked" (「純正」 vs. 「盗品」, "Junsei" vs. "Tōhin")
112	November 17, 2015	978-4-06-395570-5
Round 1103: "A Man of Conviction" (不退転の男, Futaiten no Otoko); Round 1104: "Expert Use Of Stolen Goods" (盗品の名手, Tōhin no Meishu); Round 1105: "Those Who Support the Hawk" (鷹を支える者達, Taka o Sasaeru Mono-tachi); Round 1106: "He Can Do Anything" (なんでもできる, Nandemo Dekiru); Round 1107: "Right in the Middle" (ド真ん中へ, Do Man'naka e); Round 1108: "Champion Equilibrium" (王達の均衡, Ō Itaru no Kinkō); Round 1109: "Hundred Point Man" (百点の男, Hyaku-ten no Otoko); Round 1110: "Million Point Man" (一万点の男, Ichi Man-ten no Otoko); Round 1111: "Total War" (総力戦, Sōryoku-sen); Round 1112: "An Unexpected Hit" (慮外の被弾, Ryogai no Hidan); Round 1113: "Weakness" (弱点, Jakuten)
113	March 17, 2016	978-4-06-395579-8
Round 1114: "Willpower Infusion" (意志の注入, Ishi no Chūnyū); Round 1115: "A Ferocious Night" (獰猛なる夜, Dōmōnaru Yoru); Round 1116: "The Hawk's Dream" (鷹の見る夢, Taka no Miru Yume); Round 1117: "I Won't Let It" (認めねぇぞ, Mitomenē zo); Round 1118: "Calling to the Hawk" (鷹を呼ぶ声, Taka o Yobu Koe); Round 1119: "Takamura Mamoru can..." (鷹村守と書いて, Takamura Mamoru to Kaite); Round 1120: "Birth of a Conqueror!" (覇王誕生!, Haō Tanjō!); Round 1121: "Almighty" (オールマイティー, Ōrumaitī); Round 1122: "Glory Rains Upon the Hawk" (鷹に栄光降りそそぐ, Taka ni Eikō Furisosogu); Round 1123: "Impressions and Premonitions" (余韻、そして予感, Yoin, Soshite Yokan); Round 1124: "A Resolute Look" (決意の表情, Ketsui no Hyōjō); Round 1125: "The King's Parade" (王様のパレード, Ōsama no Parēdo)
114	June 17, 2016	978-4-06-395687-0
Round 1126: "Mental Training" (精神修行, Seishin Shugyō); Round 1127: "Beyond the Lightning God's Gaze" (雷神の見つめる先は, Raijin no Mitsumeru Saki wa); Round 1128: "Your Life's Script" (人生の台本, Jinsei no Daihon); Round 1129: "Wanna Come Live At My Place?" (ワイの家来えへんか?, Wai no Kerai e Hen ka?); Round 1130: "Ippo's Fist" (一歩の拳, Ippo no Ken); Round 1131: "Shape of a Fist" (拳の形, Ken no Katachi); Round 1132: "Fist of Betrayal" (裏切りの拳, Uragiri no Ken); Round 1133: "The Prodigy's Fists" (縦の拳, Tate no Ken); Round 1134: "A New Weapon" (新型兵器, Shingata Heiki); Round 1135: "Bell Horn" (ベルツノ, Berutsuno); Round 1136: "On the Brink" (崖っぷち, Gakeppuchi)
115	September 16, 2016	978-4-06-395762-4
Round 1137: "Next Champion" (ネクストチャンピオン, Nekusuto Chanpion); Round 1138: "Lots of Different Frogs" (カエルにゃ色々あるけれど, Kaeru nya Iroiro Arukeredo); Round 1139: "Time To Hunt" (狩りの時, Kari no toki); Round 1140: "Iga vs. Oushima" (伊賀vs.王島, Iga vs.-Ō shima); Round 1141: "The Prince's Skill" (王子の実力, Ōji no jitsuryoku); Round 1142: "Iga's Irritation" (伊賀 苛立つ, Iga iradatsu); Round 1143: "The Ideal" (理想像, Risō-zō); Round 1144: "Aiming For a Fresh Start" (再始動に向けて, Saishidō ni mukete); Round 1145: "The Budding New Attack" (芽吹きの一撃, Saishidō ni mukete); Round 1146: "First Cries of the New Model" (新型の産声, Shingata no ubugoe); Round 1147: "A New Orbit" (真の軌道, Shin no kidō)
116	December 16, 2016	978-4-06-395832-4
Round 1148: "The Forging" (鍛錬, Tanren); Round 1149: "Practicing Sustained Offense" (乱れ打ち猛特訓, Midare uchi mō tokkun); Round 1150: "Where the Strong Stand" (強者の責, Tsuwamono no seme); Round 1151: "Ippo's Responsibility" (一歩の責任, Ippo no sekinin); Round 1152: "The Old Champion Falls From Glory" (往時の王は地に伏す, Ōji no ō wa ji ni fusu); Round 1153: "Suspicion of Tragedy" (悲劇的疑惑, Higeki-teki giwaku); Round 1154: "The Line on the Paper" (紙上の線, Shijō no sen); Round 1155: "At the Beach House" (海の家にて, Uminoya nite); Round 1156: "Over the Course of a Lifetime" (一度の生の中で, Ichido no nama no naka de); Round 1157: "Magic" (魔法, Mahō); Round 1158: "Bowling Time" (ボウリング・タイム, Bōringu taimu); Round 1159: "Plan to Strengthen" (強化計画, Kyōka keikaku)
117	April 17, 2017	978-4-06-395902-4
Round 1160: "Nagumo vs. ..." (南雲VS......, Nagumo VS......); Round 1161: "Cleared Skies" (明けた空, Aketa sora); Round 1162: "Moon Walking" (月面歩行, Getsumen hokō); Round 1163: "Transformation" (変貌, Henbō); Round 1164: "The Return!" (帰還！, Kikan!); Round 1165: "Ten Count" (10カウント, 10 Kaunto); Round 1166: "Movin' On!" (Movin' on!, Movin' on!); Round 1167: "Flesh and Blood" (血肉, Chiniku); Round 1168: "Imagine" (Imagine, Imagine); Round 1169: "Question" (質問, Shitsumon); Round 1170: "Rhythm" (リズム, Rizumu); Round 1171: "Beyond Just a Little Further" (あとちょっとの向こう, Ato chotto no mukō)
118	July 14, 2017	978-4-06-510087-5
Round 1172: "In Pursuit of What's Next" (次のものの追求, Tsugi no mono no tsuikyū); Round 1173: "Extraordinary" (特別な, Tokubetsuna); Round 1174: "Southpaws" (サウスポー, Sausupō); Round 1175: "Rare Breed" (希少品種, Kishō hinshu); Round 1176: "The Coach's Scolding" (コーチの叱責, Kōchi no shisseki); Round 1177: "The Night Before Battle" (バトル前の夜, Batoru mae no yoru); Round 1178: "The Audience" (聴衆, Chōshū); Round 1179: "To The Ring of His Return" (彼の帰還の輪に, Kare no kikan no wa ni); Round 1180: "Southpaw Battle" (サウスポーバトル, Sausupōbatoru); Round 1181: "Charge" (チャージ, Chāji); Round 1182: "Pursuit" (追求, Tsuikyū)
119	November 11, 2017	978-4-06-510246-6
Round 1183: "Thin" (肉薄, Nikuhaku); Round 1184: "A Big Rock" (巨岩, Kyogan); Round 1185: "Repayment" (恩返し, Ongaeshi); Round 1186: "Guevara's Decision" (ゲバラの選択, Gebara no sentaku); Round 1187: "Acceleration" (加速, Kasoku); Round 1188: "Deadly Storm" (必殺の嵐, Hissatsu no arashi); Round 1189: "Invisible Wall" (見えざる壁, Miezaru kabe); Round 1190: "Roaring Wind" (風鳴, Kazana); Round 1191: "Declaration!" (宣言！, Sengen!); Round 1192: "Crossing" (交錯, Kōsaku); Round 1193: "Close Battle" (至近戦); Round 1194: "Impatience" (焦燥, Shōsō); Round 1195: "When Fists Cross" (拳重なる時, Ken kasanaru toki)
120	March 16, 2018	978-4-06-511076-8
Round 1196: "Wounded Wind God" (手負いの風神, Teoi no fūjin); Round 1197: "Collapse" (破綻, Hatan); Round 1198: "Ray of Hope" (一縷の望み, Ichirunonozomi); Round 1199: "The Brink of Death" (死線, Shisen); Round 1200: "Sudden Death" (サドンデス, Sadondesu); Round 1201: "Sincerely" (心から, Kokoro kara); Round 1202: "The Conclusion" (終局, Shūkyoku); Round 1203: "Dark Night" (夜暗, Yoru kura); Round 1204: "The Solitary Hawk" (孤高の鷹, Kokō no taka); Round 1205: "Tear the Book of the Night" (夜の帳を引き裂け, Yoru no tobari o hikisake); Round 1206: "Way Home" (帰り道, Kaerimichi); Round 1207: "In The Futon" (布団の中で, Futon no naka de)
