= List of Hajime no Ippo volumes (121–current) =

Hajime no Ippo (はじめの一歩; lit. 'The First Step') is a Japanese boxing manga series written and illustrated by George Morikawa. It has been serialized by Kodansha in Weekly Shōnen Magazine since 1989 and collected in 145 tankōbon to date. It follows the story of high school student Makunouchi Ippo, as he begins his career in boxing and over time obtains many titles and defeats various opponents.

== Volume list ==
| No. | Japanese release date | Japanese ISBN |
|---|---|---|
| 121 | May 17, 2018 | 978-4-06-511417-9 |
Round 1208: "Leaves" (木の葉, Ko no Ha); Round 1209: "Flashback" (flashback, flashback); Round 1210: "After Leaving the Ring" (リングを降りて ··, Ringu o Orite..); Round 1211: "Pro" (プロ, Puro); Round 1212: "I'll Take Care of Him" (面倒看るって, Mendou Mirutte); Round 1213: "With Pride" (胸を張って, Mune o Hatte); Round 1214: "Angel and Demon" (鬼と仏, Oni to Hotoke); Round 1215: "Before a Calm Sea" (穏やかな海で, Odayakana umi de); Round 1216: "Rev Your Egine" (ドドド, Dododo); Round 1217: "Saisen" (お養线, Osaisen); Round 1218: "Create a Legend" (伝説作れ, Densetsu Tsukure)
| 122 | August 17, 2018 | 978-4-06-511799-6 |
Round 1219: "The man called Hayami Ryuichi" (速水龍一という男, Hayami Ryūichi to iu otoko); Round 1220: "Shoryu" (昇龍, Shouryuu); Round 1221: "The Dragon's Wound" (龍の傷, Ryuu no Kizu); Round 1222: "Flying Chair" (flying chair, flying chair); Round 1223: "Ippo the Second" (セコンドー歩, Sekondō Ippo); Round 1224: "Support Role" (脇役, Wakiyaku); Round 1225: "Mom" (母のこと, Haha no Koto); Round 1226: "A Second's Job" (セコンドという仕事, Sekondo to iu shigoto); Round 1227: "Hit the Ground!" (大地を叩く!, Daichi o kōgeki suru!); Round 1228: "Budding Talent" (才能の芽, Sainou no Me); Round 1229: "You're Strong" (キミは強い, Kimi wa tsuyoi)
| 123 | November 16, 2018 | 978-4-06-513251-7 |
Round 1230: "Anomaly" (変調, Henchou); Round 1231: "Not Qualified To Be A Pro" (プロになるための資格, Puro Shikkaku); Round 1232: "Shut up!!" (黙れっ!, Damare!!); Round 1233: "Where" (どこへ, Doko e); Round 1234: "A Perfect Day for Fishing" (釣り日和, Tsuri Biyori); Round 1235: "Working" (working, working); Round 1236: "Visitor" (訪問者, Hōmonsha); Round 1237: "Apology" (謝罪, Shazai); Round 1238: "A Fluttering Condition" (舞い落ちる条件, Mai Ochiru Jōken); Round 1239: "In My Hands" (彼手の中に, Te no Naka ni); Round 1240: "By Themselves" (水入らず, Mizuirazu)
| 124 | March 15, 2019 | 978-4-06-514127-4 |
Round 1241: "Family" (家族, Kazoku); Round 1242: "Rainstorm" (暴風雨, Bōfūu); Round 1243: "Betrayal" (裏切り, Uragiri); Round 1244: "Turning Himself In" (自首, Jishu); Round 1245: "Ippo's Fists" (一歩の拳, Ippo no ken); Round 1246: "Atonement" (償い, Tsugunai); Round 1247: "Light" (光, Hikari); Round 1248: "The Aoki Family" (青木家, Aoki ya); Round 1249: "Baldychu and Me" (ハゲチューと私, Hagechu to watashi); Round 1250: "The Class of Feathers" (羽根の階級, Hane no Kaikyū); Round 1251: "The Most Precious Person in the World" (世界一大切な人, Sekaiichi Taisetsunahito)
| 125 | July 17, 2019 | 978-4-06-515079-5 |
Round 1252: "The Reaper's Lineage" (死神の家系, Shinigami no kakei); Round 1253: "Three Weaknesses" (三つの弱点 (Mittsu no jakuten); Round 1254: "The Reaper's Methodology" (死神の殺り方, Shinigami no yarikata); Round 1255: "Iga's Counterattack!?" (伊賀、反撃!?, Iga, hangeki!?); Round 1256: "Emotion OFF" (感情OFF, Kanjō ofu); Round 1257: "Kurita's Training Method" (栗田の躾, Kurita no shitsuke); Round 1258: "The Hidden Dragon Fish" (潜む龍魚, Hisomu Ryuugyo); Round 1259: "The True Weakness" (弱点の正体, Jakuten no shoutai); Round 1260: "Who On Earth Am I..." (一体、オレは··。, Ittai, ore wa..。); Round 1261: "Overcome Your Weaknesses" (弱点をのりこえて, Jakuten o norikoete); Round 1262: "One Short" (一枚足りない, Ichimai tarinai); Round 1263: "Forgotten Teachings" (忘れていた教え, Wasure teita oshie)
| 126 | October 17, 2019 | 978-4-06-517210-0 |
Round 1264: "The Sandbag's Silent Sway" (サンドバッグは静かに揺れる, Sandobaggu wa shizuka ni yureru); Round 1265: "The Goat's True Strength" (ゴートの実力, Goat no Jitsuryoku); Round 1266: "The Barrier to the World Stage" (世界の差し合い, Sekai no Sashiai); Round 1267: "Come Here" (ここに来る, Koko ni kuru); Round 1268: "A Bold Super Middleweight Declaration!" (堂々！S・ミドル宣言, Dōdō! S ・ Midoru Sengen); Round 1269: "I'm Back!" (戻った, Modotta); Round 1270: "Numbering" (ナンバリング, Nanbaringu); Round 1271: "I Can Die!" (死ねるぅ！, Shineru ~u!); Round 1272: "They Speak Spanish in Mexico" (メキシコはスペイン語, Mekishiko wa Supeingo); Round 1273: "The Junior Heavyweight Hero" (J・ヘビー級の英雄, J hebī-kyū no eiyū); Round 1274: "The Champion and The Tiger" (王者と虎, Ōja to tora)
| 127 | February 17, 2020 | 978-4-06-517210-0 |
Round 1275: "The Reason Why He's Undefeated" (無敗の理由は, Muhai no Wake wa); Round 1276: "Let Me Ask It Once More" (今、再びの問い, Ima, Futatabi no Toi); Round 1277: "Sparring Tournament" (スパー大会, Supā Taikai); Round 1278: "A Dissatisfied Homecoming" (不満の帰国, Fuman no Kikoku); Round 1279: "A Spar on the Roof" (屋上でのスパー, Okujō de no Supā); Round 1280: "The Takamura Statue Saw That..." (鷹村像は見ていた, Takamura-zō wa mite ita); Round 1281: "Factorization" (因数, Insū); Round 1282: "Kimura's Problem" (木村の問題, Kimura no Mondai); Round 1283: "One More Kilogram" (あと1キロ, Ato 1-Kiro); Round 1284: "The Half-Dead Weigh-In" (半死半生の計量, Hanshihanshō no Keiryō); Round 1285: "The Kamikaze Dragon-Fish Strategy" (特攻龍魚作戦, Tokkō Ryū-gyo Sakusen)
| 128 | June 17, 2020 | 978-4-06-519177-4 |
Round 1286: "Ah!" (あ！, A!); Round 1287: "The Remaining 20 Seconds" (残り20秒, Nokori 20-byō); Round 1288: "The Plan is Rooted in Your Experience" (策は経験の中にあり, Saku wa Keiken no Naka ni ari); Round 1289: "Dragon Fish or Fish Dragon?" (龍魚？魚龍？; Ryū Sakana? Sakana Ryū?); Round 1290: "It Was the Same for Me" (自分もそうだった。, Jibun mo Sōdatta.); Round 1291: "If It Were to Happen..." (もしもそうなるなら, Moshimo sō Narunara); Round 1292: "Ippo, Onwards to Mexico!" (一歩、メキシコへ!, Ippo, Mekishiko e!); Round 1293: "At the Press Conference (見場にて, Kaiken-ba nite); Round 1294: "The Best Final Tune-Up He Could Ask For" (最高の最終調整, Saikō no Saishū Chōsei); Round 1295: "The Grim Reaper's Lessons" (死神の指導, Shinigami no Shidō); Round 1296: "The Person I Can Believe In" (信頼をおける人。, Shinrai o Okeru Hito.)
| 129 | November 17, 2020 | 978-4-06-521304-9 |
Round 1297: "Show Me Yer Guts!" (本性見せろや, Honshō Miseroya); Round 1298: "An Exchange of Mistakes" (誤りの交差, Ayamari no Kōsa); Round 1299: "Sendō's Core" (千堂の原点, Sendō no Genten); Round 1300: "The Second Great Quake" (再びの熱狂, Futatabi no Nekkyō); Round 1301: "Yanoaka's Gamble" (柳岡の賭け, Yagioka no Kake); Round 1302: "The Tiger is Exhausted" (疲弊する虎, Hihei suru Tora); Round 1303: "A Good Friend in Mexico" (メヒコのマブダチ, Mehiko no Mabudachi); Round 1304: "Don't Cool Him Down!" (冷やすな！, Hiyasu na!); Round 1305: "The Courageous Tiger" (勇敢な虎, Yūkan'na Tora); Round 1306: "The Injured Tiger" (手負いの虎, Teoi no Tora); Round 1307: ¡ganador!
| 130 | March 17, 2021 | 978-4-06-522652-0 |
Round 1308: "A Graceful Defeat" (偉大な敗者, Idaina Haisha); Round 1309: "Magic Words" (魔法の言葉, Mahō no Kotoba); Round 1310: "The First Swing" (最初の一振り, Saisho no Hitofuri); Round 1311: "Both Fighters' Styles" (両者のスタイル, Ryōsha no Sutairu); Round 1312: "I'm Not God" (両者のスタイル, Ryōsha no Sutairu); Round 1313: "Ricardo's Expectations" (リカルドの期待, Rikarudo no Kitai); Round 1314: "Somebody, please..." (誰か私を・・, Dare ka Watashi o); Round 1315: "¡Adiós! (アディオス！", Adiosu!); Round 1316: "I'm Home, Japan! (ただいま日本, Tadaima Nihon); Round 1317: "The Secret Behind Holding Mitts" (ミットの極意, Mitto no Gokui); Round 1318: "The Man from Manhattan" (摩天楼の男, Matenrō no Otoko); Round 1319: "The Conditions for Being Champion" (王者の条件, Ōja no Jōken)
| 131 | June 17, 2021 | 978-4-06-523576-8 |
Round 1320: "Takamura's Reasons" (鷹村の事情, Takamura no Jijō); Round 1321: "His Back Says Everything" (雄弁な背中, Yūben'na Senaka); Round 1322: "Luck Limit?" (運量？, Un-ryō?); Round 1323: "News of Bad Luck" (不運の報せ, Fuun no Shirase); Round 1324: "What are Miracles?" (奇跡とは, Kiseki to wa); Round 1325: "The Dragon Arrives in Japan" (ドラゴン、来日, Doragon, Rainichi); Round 1326: "The King of the Underworld" (闇の王, Yami no Ō); Round 1327: "Tile Match Begins" (闘牌開始, Tōhai Kaishi); Round 1328: "Can You Feel The Wind?" (風を感じぬか, Kaze o Kanjinu ka); Round 1329: "A Request of the Gods" (神頼み, Kamidanomi); Round 1330: "The Night Before the Decisive Battle" (決戦前夜, Kessen Zen'ya)
| 132 | September 17, 2021 | 978-4-06-524835-5 |
Round 1331: "Towards the Uninhabited Wilderness" (無人の荒野へ, Mujin no Kōya e); Round 1332: "That Promise" (あの約束, Ano Yakusoku); Round 1333: "Do We Understand Each Other?" (通じ合ってる？, Tsūji Atteru?); Round 1334: "Entrance Ceremony" (入場セレモニー, Nyūjō Seremonī); Round 1335: "From the Get-Go" (最初(のっけ)から, Saisho (nokke) Kara); Round 1336: "A Class Called Super Middleweight" (S・ミドルという階級, S Midoru to iu Kaikyū); Round 1337: "An Uncomfortable Feeling" (違和感, Iwakan); Round 1338: "The Source of the Uncomfortable Feeling" (違和感の正体, Iwakan no Shōtai); Round 1339: "Overflowing!!" (溢れ出る！！, Afure Deru!!); Round 1340: "A Hawk Soaring Through The Skies" (大空を舞う鷹, Ōzora o Mau Taka); Round 1341: "I'm So Damn Strong" (オレ 様強えっ, Ore-sama Tsuyo e); Round 1342: "The Champion's Counter" (王者のカウンター, Ōja no Kauntā)
| 133 | December 17, 2021 | 978-4-06-526282-5 |
Round 1343: "God's Divine Protection" (神のご加護, Kami no go Kago); Round 1344: "Trump Card" (奥の手, Okunote); Round 1345: "Three-legged Race" (二人三脚, Nininsankyaku); Round 1346: "Let It Slide" (もらって滑らす, Moratte Suberasu); Round 1347: "In This Fist" (この拳で, Kono Ken de); Round 1348: "The Secret Behind the Left Swing" (左スイングの秘密, Hidari Suingu no Himitsu); Round 1349: "After the Fierce Battle" (激闘の後に, Gekitō no Nochi ni); Round 1350: "Keith's Back" (キースの後ろ姿, Kīsu no Ushirosugata); Round 1351: "The Makunouchi Generation" (幕之内世代, Makunouchi Sedai); Round 1352: "Encouragement Party" (激励会, Gekirei-kai); Round 1353: "The Mashiba Siblings" (間柴兄妹, Mashiba Kyōdai)
| 134 | March 17, 2022 | 978-4-06-527275-6 |
Round 1354: "Mister 1-R" (ミスター1R, Misutā 1 R); Round 1355: "A Battle of Strength" (力勝負, Chikara Shōbu); Round 1356: "Advance, Retreat, Repeat" (一進一退, Isshin'ittai); Round 1357: "A Battle of Wills" (我慢比べ, Gaman Kurabe); Round 1358: "An Unthinkable Opponent" (意外な対戦相手, Igaina Taisen Aite); Round 1359: "Sun of the Southern Kingdom" (南国の太陽, Nangoku no Taiyō); Round 1360: "A Reunion with Volg" (ヴォルグとの再会, Vu~orugu to no Saikai); Round 1361: "The Grim Reaper's Distress" (死神の憂い, Shinigami no Urei); Round 1362: "Before the World Title Preliminary Match" (前哨戦の前, Zenshōsen no Mae); Round 1363: "Mashiba's World Title Preliminary Match" (間柴の世界前哨戦, Mashiba no Sekai Zenshōsen); Round 1364: "Garcia's True Strength" (ガルシアの実力, Garushia no Jitsuryoku); Round 1365: "World-Level Techniques" (世界レベルの技術, Sekai Reberu no Gijutsu); Round 1366: "Whispers from the Devil" (悪魔のささやき, Akuma no Sasayaki)
| 135 | July 15, 2022 | 978-4-06-528774-3 |
Round 1367: "What Am I Hearing?" (何を聞いている？, Nani o Kiite Iru?); Round 1368: "Mashiba's Aim" (間柴の狙い, Mashiba no Nerai); Round 1369: "50-50" (五分と五分, Go-bu to Go-bu); Round 1370: "The Barrier That is the World" (世界の壁, Sekai no Kabe); Round 1371: "Advice" (助言, Jogen); Round 1372: "Mashiba's Choice" (間柴の選択肢, Mashiba no Sentakushi); Round 1373: "I Won't Accept It" (認めねえ, Mitomenē); Round 1374: "I Realise Now" (思い知る, Omoishiru); Round 1375: "The Day He's Accepted by the World" (世界が認める日, Sekai ga Shitatameru hi); Round 1376: "Dashes on the Riverbank" (土手ダッシュ, Dote Dasshu); Round 1377: "Brother Disciples" (兄弟弟子, Kyōdai Deshi); Round 1378: "What's Guiding Him" (指導方針, Shidō Hōshin); Round 1379: "What I Can Do Now" (今できること, Ima Dekiru Koto)
| 136 | November 17, 2022 | 978-4-06-529638-7 |
Round 1380: "Sun" (太陽, Taiyō); Round 1381: "Return Visit to Mexico" (メキシコ再訪, Mekishiko Saihō); Round 1382: "Reunion" (再会, Saikai); Round 1383: "Wally's Evolution" (ウォーリーの進化, U~ōrī no Shinka); Round 1384: "Vigilance Level" (警戒レベル, Keikai Reberu); Round 1385: "Pay Him Back Hard as I Can!" (全力恩返し, Zenryoku Ongaeshi); Round 1386: "Sendō vs. Volg?" (千堂vs.ヴォルグ？, Sendō vs. Vu~orugu?); Round 1387: "What's Clinging to Him?" (まとわりつくもの, Matowaritsuku Mono); Round 1388: "As He Is" (ありのままで, Arinomamade); Round 1389: "An Abrupt Proposal" (突然の提案, Totsuzen no Teian); Round 1390: "Volg's Issue" (ヴォルグの問題点, Vu~orugu no Mondaiten); Round 1391: "The Object of His Grudge" (怨みの矛先, Urami no Hokosaki); Round 1392: "α and Ω" (αとΩ, α to Ω)
| 137 | March 16, 2023 | 978-4-06-530922-3 |
Round 1393: "The Pure Challenger" (無垢なる挑戦者, Mukunaru Chōsen-sha); Round 1394: "Every Which Way" (縦横無尽, Jūōmujin); Round 1395: "Wally's Taking the Initiative!" (ウォーリー先制！, U~ōrī Sensei!); Round 1396: "Unknown Boxing" (未知のボクシング, Michi no Bokushingu); Round 1397: "Ricardo's Choice" (リカルドの選択, Rikarudo no Sentaku); Round 1398: "Like the Tip of a Blade" (刃物の先端の如く, Hamono no Sentan Nogotoku); Round 1399: "The Devil's Teachings" (悪魔の知恵, Akuma no Chie); Round 1400: "The Primordial Hunter" (原初の狩人, Gensho no Kariudo); Round 1401: "A Warrior That Knows Great Oceans" (大海を知る戦士, Taikai o Shiru Senshi); Round 1402: "The Gap Between Their Camps" (チーム力の差, Chīmu-ryoku no Sa); Round 1403: "The Utmost Limit of Fundamentals" (基本の限界値, Kihon no Genkaichi); Round 1404: "The Champion's Counterattack" (王者の逆襲, Ōja no Gyakushū); Round 1405: "Textbook" (教科書通り, Kyōkasho-dōri)
| 138 | July 14, 2023 | 978-4-06-532178-2 |
Round 1406: "Final Trump Card" (最終奥義, Saishū Ōgi); Round 1407: "Let's Punch It Out Right Here" (ここで打ち合おう, Koko de Uchiaou); Round 1408: "The Pure One" (無垢なる者, Mukunaru Mono); Round 1409: "My Last Sun" (私の最後太陽 (わたしのラストサン), Watashi no Saigo Taiyō (Watashi no Rasuto San)); Round 1410: "At the End of the Death Match" (死闘の果てに, Shitō no Hate ni); Round 1411: "The Two Winners" (二人の勝者, Futari no Shōsha); Round 1412: "The Dog Chases, The Cat is Chased" (追う犬、追われる猫, Ou Inu, Owareru Neko); Round 1413: "The Aftermath of the Heated Battle" (熱戦の余韻, Nessen no Yoin); Round 1414: "Souvenirs From Mexico" (メキシコ土産, Mekishiko Miyage); Round 1415: "If You Listen Closely" (耳を澄ませば, Mimi o Sumaseba); Round 1416: "The Ever-Changing Landscape" (変わり行く景色, Kawari Iku Keshiki); Round 1417: "Only Me" (ボクだけが, Boku Dake ga); Round 1418: "Marcus Rosario" (マーカス・ロザリオ, Mākasu Rozario)
| 139 | November 16, 2023 | 978-4-06-533516-1 |
Round 1419: "Bring Him to Me" (早くコイツを, Hayaku Koitsu o); Round 1420: "Tonight!!" (今夜こそ!!", Kon'ya koso!!); Round 1421: "Three-Sided Struggle!" (三つ巴！, Mitsudomoe!); Round 1422: "The One Who Can't Accept It" (浮かばれないヤツ, Ukaba Renai Yatsu); Round 1423: "The Tiger's Thirst" (虎の渇き, Tora no Kawaki); Round 1424: "Beast vs. Beast" (猛獣対決, Mōjū Taiketsu); Round 1425: "Secret Weapon" (秘密兵器, Himitsu Heiki); Round 1426: "The Champion's Feeling" (王者の気分, Ōja no Kibun); Round 1427: "Trust" (信頼感, Shinrai-kan); Round 1428: "Resolve?" (カクゴ？, Kakugo?); Round 1429: "Shall We Go to the Ocean?" (海に行きませんか, Umi ni Ikimasen ka)
| 140 | February 16, 2024 | 978-4-06-534556-6 |
Round 1430: "The Two with No Destination" (あてなき二人, Atenaki Futari); Round 1431: "The Grim Reaper's Dream" (死神の夢, Shinigami no Yume); Round 1432: "The Ideal Partner" (理想のパートナー, Risō no Pātonā); Round 1433: "Switch to Southpaw!?" (サウスポー転向！？, Sausupō Tenkō!?); Round 1434: "I'm Not Confident" (自信はありません, Jishin wa Arimasen); Round 1435: "His Sparring Partner is a Southpaw" (スパーリングパートナーは左利き, Supāringu Pātonā wa Hidarikiki); Round 1436: "Just Like I Pictured" (イメージ通り, Imēji-dōri); Round 1437: "Exact Copy" (完コピ, Kan Kopi); Round 1438: "The World Title Match Method" (世界戦仕様, Sekai-sen Shiyō); Round 1439: "Perfect Sparring" (完璧なスパーリング, Kanpekina Supāringu); Round 1440: "Why Not Just Tell Him?" (伝えればいいのに, Tsutaereba Inoni); Round 1441: "Itagaki's on Fire" (燃えてる板垣, Moe teru Itagaki); Round 1442: "Where the Flames Go" (炎上の行方, Enjō no Yukue)
| 141 | July 17, 2024 | 978-4-06-536158-0 |
Round 1443: "The Flames Die Down" (炎上の末路, Enjō no Matsuro); Round 1444: "Uproar" (騒然, Sōzen); Round 1445: "The Champion Is Missing!" (王者失踪!, Ōja Shissō!); Round 1446: "Rosario Arrives in Japan" (ロザリオ来日, Rozario Rainichi); Round 1447: "The Twisted Champion" (歪んでいる王者, Yugande iru Ōja); Round 1448: "Encouragement on the Night Before" (前夜の激励, Zen'ya no Gekirei); Round 1449: "The Greatest Encouragement" (最高の激励, Saikō no Gekirei); Round 1450: "Rosario in Battle Mode" (ロザリオ戦闘モード, Rozario Sentō Mōdo); Round 1451: "The Grim Reaper's Descent in Yokohama" (死神降臨in横浜, Shinigami Kōrin in Yokohama); Round 1452: "The Grim Reaper's First Move" (死神の初手, Shinigami no Shote); Round 1453: "Just As You See" (見ての通り, Mitenotōri); Round 1454: "A White-Hot Round 1" (白熱の第1R（ラウンド）, Hakunetsu no Dai 1R (Raundo)); Round 1455: "Unexpect" (予定外, Yotei-gai)
| 142 | December 17, 2024 | 978-4-06-537776-5 |
Round 1456: "The Champion's Front Foot" (王者の前足, Ōja no Maeashi); Round 1457: "Not the First Time!!" (初見じゃないのか!!, Hatsumi Janai no ka!!); Round 1458: "Mashiba Chant" (間柴コール, Mashiba Kōru); Round 1459: "A Wicked Invitation" (邪な誘い, Yokoshimana Sasoi); Round 1460: "The Devilish Distance" (魔性の距離, Mashō no Kyori); Round 1461: "Assault" (迎え撃つ, Mukaeutsu); Round 1462: "Hairstyle" (髪型, Kamigata); Round 1463: "Fist and Head" (頭と拳, Atama to Ken); Round 1464: "Unforgivable" (許さねえ, Yurusanē); Round 1465: "Left Eye" (左目, Hidarime); Round 1466: "Rough Fight" (ラフファイト, Rafu Faito); Round 1467: "Mashiba's True Nature" (間柴の本性, Mashiba no Honsei); Round 1468: "Proof" (証明, Shōmei); Round 1469: "Path to Victory" (勝ち筋, Kachi-kin)
| 143 | April 16, 2025 | 978-4-06-539043-6 |
Round 1470: "A Dangerous Sign" (危険な兆候, Kiken'na Chōkō); Round 1471: "Lightning Strike" (落雷, Rakurai); Round 1472: "Accumulation" (蓄積, Chikuseki); Round 1473: "The Man in Front of Me" (目の前の男, Me no Mae no Otoko); Round 1474: "Close-Range Fight" (接近戦, Sekkin-sen); Round 1475: "Nourishment" (糧, Kate); Round 1476: "Cut It Off" (断ち切れ, Tachikire); Round 1477: "Limit Line" (限界のライン, Genkai no Rain); Round 1478: "What I Always Say" (言い続けてきた, Ii Tsudzukete Kita); Round 1479: "Sister" (妹よ, Imōto yo); Round 1480: "The Finishing Blow" (とどめの一撃, Todome no Ichigeki); Round 1481: "Reach" (届け, Todoke); Round 1482: "Reverberating Conclusion" (響く結末, Hibiku Ketsumatsu)
| 144 | August 12, 2025 | 978-4-06-540364-8 |
Round 1483: "The One Who Stands In-Between" (狭間に立つ者, Hazama ni Tatsu Mono); Round 1484: "Signs of Rain in Naniwa" (浪花雨模様, Naniwa Amamoyō); Round 1485: "The Two Passing By" (すれ違う二人, Surechigau Futari); Round 1486: "The Ideal Style" (理想のスタイル, Risō no Sutairu); Round 1487: "Observing Eye" (観察眼, Kansatsu Me); Round 1488: "The Best Condition" (最高の状態, Saikō no Jōtai); Round 1489: "Winning Ticket" (当たりクジ, Atari Kuji); Round 1490: "White-Hot Sparring" (白熱のスパーリング, Hakunetsu no Supāringu); Round 1491: "Immovable" (不動, Fudō); Round 1492: "Miscalculation" (誤差, Gosa); Round 1493: "On a Whim" (気紛れ, Kimagure)
| 145 | January 16, 2026 | 978-4-06-542203-8 |
Round 1494: "The Silent Ring-In" (無言のリングイン, Mugon no Ringu In); Round 1495: "The Summer Siege of Osaka" (大阪夏の陣, Ōsaka Natsu no Jin); Round 1496: "Beat Him to the Punch" (機先, Kisen); Round 1497: "A Flash of His Knuckles" (ゲンコツ一閃, Genkotsu Issen); Round 1498: "Taming" (躾, Shitsuke); Round 1499: "Sinking His Teeth In" (喰らい付く豪腕, Kurai Tsuku Gōwan); Round 1500: "Impact" (着弾, Chakudan); Round 1501: "The Tiger's Tenacity" (虎の執念, Tora no Shūnen); Round 1502: "WBA Rule" (WBAルール, WBA Rūru); Round 1503: "The Tiger and Champion's Thoughts" (虎と王者(チャンピオン)の思考, Tora to Chanpion no Shikō); Round 1504: "Grandmother's Reminiscences" (祖母の追想, Sobo no Tsuisō); Round 1505: "Embodiment of Despair" (絶望の権化, Zetsubō no Gonge); Round 1506: "Clinch" (クリンチ, Kurinchi)

== Chapters not yet in tankōbon format ==
These chapters have yet to be published in a tankōbon volume. They were originally serialized in Weekly Shōnen Magazine from November 2025 to February 2026.

- Round 1507: "Comeback Knuckles" (再起のゲンコツ, Saiki no Genkotsu)
- Round 1508: "Hit 'Im, Hit 'Im" (どつけどつけ, Dotsuke Dotsuke)
- Round 1509: "Crouching Tiger" (伏虎, Fukuko)
- Round 1510: "Imposing Stance" (仁王立ち, Niōdachi)
- Round 1511: "The Intense Sendō" (滾る千堂, Tagiru Sendō)
- Round 1512: "Aiming for a Dual Exchange" (相打ち狙い, Aiuchi Nerai)
- Round 1513: "Tiger on the Move" (虎が行く, Tora ga Yuku)
- Round 1514: "Clenched Fist" (握り拳, Nigirikobushi)
- Round 1515: "Loneliness at the Top" (頂の孤独, Itadaki no Kodoku)
