= List of Hajime no Ippo volumes (1–20) =

Hajime no Ippo (はじめの一歩; lit. 'The First Step') is a Japanese boxing manga series written and illustrated by George Morikawa. It has been serialized by Kodansha in Weekly Shōnen Magazine since 1989 and collected in over 145 tankōbon to date. It follows the story of high school student Makunouchi Ippo, as he begins his career in boxing and over time obtains many titles and defeats various opponents.

== Volume list ==
No.	Japanese release date	Japanese ISBN
1	February 17, 1990	978-4-06-311532-1
Round 001: "The First Step"; Round 002: "The Turtle Strategy" (カメ作戦, Kame Sakusen); Round 003: "Fighting Pose" (ファイティング·ポーズ, Faitingu· pōzu); Round 004: "Tears of Joy" (うれし涙, Ureshi Namida); Round 005: "The 1965 Uppercut" (1965年のアッパーカット, 1965 nen no appākatto); Round 006: "Shadow Boxing" (シャドーボクシング, Shadō Bokushingu); Round 007: "The Technician" (テクニシャン, Shadō Bokushingu)
2	March 17, 1990	978-4-06-311543-7
Round 008: "The President's Tough Training" (会長のしごき, Kaichō no Shigoki); Round 009: "The Rematch Bell" (再戦のゴング, Saisen no Gongu); Round 010: "A Courageous Step Forward" (勇気ある前進, Yūki Aru Zenshin"); Round 011: "Big Chance!!" (チャンス！！, Chansu!!); Round 012: "One Last Thing" (やり残したこと, Yarinokoshita Koto); Round 013: "One Centimeter of Destruction" (1cmの破壊力, 1 senchimētoru no Hakairyoku"); Round 014: "Takamura's Regimen" (鷹村のメニュー, Takamura no Menyū); Round 015: "The Three Featherweights" (3人のフェザー級, San-jin no Fezā kyū)
3	May 17, 1990	978-4-06-311566-6
Round 016: "The C Class License" (C級ライセンス, C-Kyō Raisensu); Round 017: "Spineless" (根性なし, Konjō nashi); Round 018: "Handmade Trunks" (手作りのトランクス, Tezukuri no torankusu); Round 019: "Debut" (デビュー, Debyū); Round 020: "Oh, God!!" (神様！！, Kami-sama!!); Round 021: "Medical Stoppage!?" (ドクターストップ！？, Dokutā Sutoppu!?); Round 022: "The Sudden Southpaw" (突然、サウスポー, Totsuzen, Sausupō); Round 023: "The Taste of the First Victory" (初勝利の味, Hatsu shōri no aji); Round 024: "Peek-a-boo" (ピーカブー, Pīkabū)
4	August 17, 1990	978-4-06-311591-8
Round 025: "On Purpose" (故意, Koi); Round 026: "Buds" (ダチ, Dachi); Round 027: "Ring Names" (リングネーム, Ringu Nēmu); Round 028: "The Boxer from Abroad" (黒人ボクサー, Kokujin Bokusā); Round 029: "The Murder Hook" (殺人フック, Satsujin Fukku); Round 030: "Rookie King Opener" (新人王戦開幕, Shinjin ō sen kaimaku); Round 031: "The Early Bird" (先手必勝, Sente hisshō); Round 032: "Stop Ozuma!" (オズマを止めろ！！, Ozuma o tomero!!); Round 033: "Working, or Not?" (きいてるorきいてない？, Kīteru ō āru kīte nai?)
5	October 17, 1990	978-4-06-311608-3
Round 034: "The Nine Count" (カウント9, Kaunto 9); Round 035: "Applause for the Defeated" (敗者へのアプローズ, Haisha e no apurōzu); Round 036: "Shampoo" (シャンプー, Shanpū); Round 037: "Hustle" (ハッスル, Hassuru); Round 038: "The First Seed" (第一シード, Dai-ichi Shīdo); Round 039: "Ippo On The Beach"; Round 040: "Training Camp" (合宿, Gasshuku); Round 041: "Secret of the Soles" (足の裏の秘密, Ashi no ura no himitsu); Round 042: "Wish Upon a Star" (星に願いを, Hoshi ni negai o)
6	December 14, 1990	978-4-06-311625-0
Round 043: "The Secret Strategy Notes" (㊙攻略メモ, Maru Hi kōrya ku memo); Round 044: "The Powerless Champion" (非力なチャンピオン, Hiriki na chanpion); Round 045: "The Clinch" (クリンチ, Kurinchu); Round 046: "Spinning His Wheels" (カラ回り, Kara mawari); Round 047: "The Strategy Revealed" (明かされた作戦, Akasare ta sakusen); Round 048: "The Sweet, Dangerous Lure" (甘く危険な誘惑, Amaku kiken na yūwaku); Round 049: "Impossible Dreams" (見果てぬ夢, Miha tenu yume); Round 050: "The Japan Middleweight Title Bout" (日本ミドル級タイトルマッチ, Nihon Midoru Kyū Taitoru Matchi); Round 051: "The Challenger Strikes Back" (挑戦者の逆襲, Chōsen sha no gyakushū)
7	February 16, 1991	978-4-06-311641-0
Round 052: "Consultation on Future Course" (進路相談, Shinro sōdan); Round 053: "filn-fighting Killer" (インファイター殺し, Infaitā goroshi); Round 054: "Shotgun Threat" (ショットガンの脅威, Shottogan no kyōi); Round 055: "Popular Man" (人気者, Ninki sha); Round 056: "The True Face of a Genius" (天才の素顔, Tensai no sugao); Round 057: "Betting Ticket" (万馬券, Man baken); Round 058: "The East Japan Rookie King Tournament Semi-Final" (東日本新人王準決勝, Higashi Nihon shinjin ō junkesshō); Round 059: "Unforeseen" (予定外, Yotei gai); Round 060: "Windmill Theory" (風車の理論, Kazaguruma no riron)
8	April 17, 1991	978-4-06-311658-8
Round 061: "Power Through Like a Boar!!" (猪のように前へ！！, Inoshishi no yō ni mae e!!); Round 062: "Ropeside Battle" (ロープ際の攻防, Rōpu giwa no kōbō); Round 063: "An Upset?!" (番狂わせか！？, Bankuruwase ka!?); Round 064: "Fall of the Prodigy" (天才の敗因, Tensai no haīn); Round 065: "A Well-Deserved Rest Day" (久しぶりの休養日, Hisashiburi no kyūyō bi); Round 066: "The Other Semi-Final Bout" (もうひとつの準決勝, Mō hitotsu no junkesshō); Round 067: "Hitman Style" (ヒットマン, Hittoman); Round 068: "Because He's Waiting For Me" (あいつが待ってる, Aitsu ga matteru); Round 069: "Boxing Shoes" (リングシューズ, Ringu Shūzu)
9	July 17, 1991	978-4-06-311690-8
Round 070: "Bird With Its Wings Pulled Off" (翼をもがれた鳥, Tsubasa o mogare ta tori); Round 071: "The One-Legged Fight" (片足だけのファイト, Katāshi dake no faito); Round 072: "The Message" (伝言, Dengon); Round 073: "The Lost Objective" (失われた目標, Ushinaware ta mokuhyō); Round 074: "The Tragic Hero" (悲劇の主人公, Higeki no shujinkō); Round 075: "The Mashibas" (間柴兄妹, Mashiba-kyōdai); Round 076: "Eight Inches of Distance" (20cmの距離, 20 senchimētoru no kyori); Round 077: "The Fist Released" (拳解禁, Kobushi kaikin zu); Round 078: "East Japan Rookie King Final" (東日本新人王決勝, Higashi Nippon shinjin ō kesshō)
10	September 17, 1991	978-4-06-311708-0
Round 079: "Hitman vs. Peek-a-boo" (ヒットマンVSピーカーブー, Hittoman VS Pīkābū); Round 080: "If You're This Good..." (こんなに強いのに, Konnani tsuyoi noni); Round 081: "An Eerie Whisper" (不気味な呟き, Bukimi na tsubuyaki); Round 082: "Shattered Hand, Unbroken Spirit" (拳が砕けようとも, Kobushi ga kudakeyo u tomo); Round 083: "Lefty Loosey" (落ちた左腕, Ochi ta sawan); Round 084: "Mashiba Stands Tall" (間柴仁王立ち, Mashiba niō dachi); Round 085: "Prodigious Perseverance" (驚異のねばり, Kyōi no nebari); Round 086: "The Hitman Returns" (甦るヒットマン, Yomigaeru Hittoman); Round 087: "One Glorious Step" (栄光の一歩, Eikō no Ippo)
11	December 13, 1991	978-4-06-311730-1
Round 088: "Ippo's Lover" (一歩の恋人, Ippo no koibito); Round 089: "I Love Fist Fights!!" (どつき合いが好き！！, Do tsukiai ga suki!!); Round 090: "Reckless Sparring" (無謀なスパーリング, Mubō na supāringu); Round 091: "A Souvenir from Tokyo" (東京スーベニール, Tōkyō Sūbenīru); Round 092: "Super Doctor Y" (スーパードクターY, Sūpā Dokutā Y); Round 093: "Delicious Training" (おいしい練習, Oishī renshū); Round 094: "Star of Osaka" (大阪の星, Ōsaka no hoshi); Round 095: "Unforeseen Enemy" (予期せぬ敵, Yoki se nu teki); Round 096: "Dragging Out the Anxiety..." (不安をひきずって・・・, Fuan o hikizutte...)
12	February 17, 1992	978-4-06-311754-7
Round 097: "The Shot" (注射, Chūsha); Round 098: "Indominable Presence" (圧倒的存在感, Attōteki sonzai kan); Round 099: "Unstoppable Sendo" (押しまくる千堂, Oshimakuru sendō); Round 100: "Return of the Right Fist" (目覚めた右拳, Mezame ta migi ken); Round 101: "Low Smash" (改良型スマッシュ, Kairyō gata sumasshu); Round 102: "The Words from That Time" (あの時の言葉, Ano toki no kotoba); Round 103: "Copycat" (似て非なるもの, Ni te hi naru mono); Round 104: "Sendo Down for the Count" (千堂、大の字, Sendō, dainoji); Round 105: "Savage Onslaught" (メッタ打ち, Metta uchi)
13	May 16, 1992	978-4-06-311783-7
Round 106: "Cornermen, Out!" (セコンドアウト, Sekondo Auto); Round 107: "The All-Japan Rookie King Is..." (全日本新人王戦決着, Zen Nihon shinjin ō sen kecchaku); Round 108: "A Disastrous Victory Celebration" (波乱の祝勝会, Haran no shukushō kai); Round 109: "Graduation" (卒業, Sotsugyō); Round 110: "New Juniors?!" (後輩ができた！？, Kōhai ga deki ta!?); Round 111: "A Chance Meeting with the Champion" (チャンプとの遭遇, Chanpu to no sōgū); Round 112: "Nine to Go" (間に9人, Ma ni kyū-nin); Round 113: "When the Fist Heals" (拳が直ったら, Kobushi ga naottara); Round 114: "An Opportune Invitation" (胸を借りる, Mune o kariru)
14	August 8, 1992	978-4-06-311814-8
Round 115: "Punching the Rust Off" (試合のカンを取り戻せ, Shiai no kan o torimodose); Round 116: "The Magic Punch" (魔法のパンチ, Mahō no panchi); Round 117: "The Secret Behind the Magic Punch" (魔法の正体, Mahō no shōtai); Round 118: "The Strongest Bully Victiim" (最強のイジメられっ子, Saikyō no ijime rarekko); Round 119: "Jealousy" (ジェラシー, Jerashī); Round 120: "Old Rookie King VS. New Rookie King" (新旧新人王対決, Shinkyū shinjin ō taiketsu); Round 121: "The Corkscrew Punch" (コークスクリュー, Kōku Sukuryū); Round 122: "His Dream Style" (憧れのスタイル, Akogare no sutairu); Round 123: "Okita's Determination" (沖田の執着心, Okita no shūchakushin)
15	October 17, 1992	978-4-06-311830-8
Round 124: "Attempting to Surpass" (追い抜こうとする者, Oinuko u to suru mono); Round 125: "Miyata's Comeback" (宮田の再起, Miyata no saiki); Round 126: "Beyond the Counter" (カウンターを超えるもの, Kauntā o koeru mono); Round 127: "The Man Who Never Smiles" (笑わない男, Warawa nai otoko); Round 128: "30-to-1 Odds" (30対1の賭け率, 30 tai 1 no kake ritsu); Round 129: "The Jolt"; Round 130: "The Storm" (スコール, Sukōru); Round 131: "A Single Smile" (たった一度のSmile, Tatta ichi do no Smile); Round 132: "The Idol Stops By" (アイドル訪問, Aidoru hōmon)
16	December 14, 1992	978-4-06-311851-3
Round 133: "Go, Puke Boy!" (がんばれ！ゲロ道, Ganbare! Gero dō); Round 134: "The Class-A Tournament" (A級ボクサートーナメント, A kyū bokusā tōnamento); Round 135: "I'm Sorry" (ごめんなさい, Gomennasai); Round 136: "Retire?" (やめる、やめない！？, Yameru, yame nai!?); Round 137: "Welcome Home Punch" (ウエルカム·パンチ, Uerukamu Panchi); Round 138: "Operation BMG" (BGM作戦, BGM sakusen); Round 139: "A Fighting Advertisement" (戦う広告塔, Tatakau kōkokutō); Round 140: "The Strongest Fists Vs. The Fastest Legs" (最強の拳VS最速の男, Saikyō no kobushi VS saisoku no otoko); Round 141: "Man of Speed" (加速する男, Kasoku suru otoko)
17	March 17, 1993	978-4-06-311881-0
Round 142: "Invisible Limbs" (見えない手足, Mienai teashi); Round 143: "To Everyone Who Was Worried" (心配かけたみんなに, Shinpai kaketa min'na ni); Round 144: "Safety Zone" (安全地帯, Anzen chitai); Round 145: "A Damage Called Fear" (恐怖というダメージ, Kyōfu to iu damēji); Round 146: "The Poster Boy Did Not Collapse" (倒れなかった広告塔, Taorenakatta kōkokutō); Round 147: "White Fang" (白い牙, Shiroi kiba); Round 148: "My Favorite Song" (My feivu~aritto Song); Round 149: "Puke Boy's Treasure" (ゲロ道の宝物, Gero michi no takaramono); Round 150: "Tearful Liver Blow" (涙のリバーブロー, Namida no ribāburō)
18	June 17, 1993	978-4-06-311909-1
Round 151: "A Harsh Cheer" (体当たりのエール, Karada atari no ēru); Round 152: "The Light and Shadow of the Ring" (リングの上の光と影, Ringu no ue no hikatokage); Round 153: "An Interview of Rage" (怒りの名伯楽, Ikarino-mei hakuraku); Round 154: "Become a Gazelle!" (カモシカになりたい！, Kamoshika ni naritai!); Round 155: "Gazelle Punch" (ガゼル パンチ, Gazeru panchi); Round 156: "A Trainer's Depression" (芸術家の憂うつ, Geijutsuka no yūutsu); Round 157: "Warm Soup" (温かいスーブ, Atatakai sūpu); Round 158: "Night Before the Class A Tournament Finals" (A級トーナメント決勝前夜, A-kyū tōnamento kesshō zen'ya); Round 159: "Beast in a Cage" (獣のオリ, Kemono no ori)
19	August 17, 1993	978-4-06-311927-5
Round 160: "You Can't Escape" (逃げられないぞ, Nige rarenai zo); Round 161: "A Wolf Too Kind" (優しすぎる狼, Yasashi sugiru ōkami); Round 162: "The Hunt Begins" (狩りが始まる, Kari ga hajimaru); Round 163: "BELIEVE"; Round 164: "Gazelle on the Edge" (瀕死のカモシカ, Hinshi no kamoshika); Round 165: "What Lies Beyond Here" (この先にあるもの, Kono sakini aru mono); Round 166: "The Flip Side of Great Talent" (まばゆい才能ゆえの・・・, Mabayui sainō-yue no); Round 167: "A Howl in Distant Memory" (遠い記憶の中の咆哮, Tōi kioku no naka no hōkō); Round 168: "The Eternal Workout" (永遠の無酸素運動, Eien no musansoundō); Round 169: "Victor on the Stretcher" (タンカにのった勝者, Tanka ni notta shōsha)
20	November 17, 1993	978-4-06-311956-5
Round 170: "Apples" (りんご, Ringo); Round 171: "Between Mixer and Filial Piety" (合コンと親孝行の間で, Gōkon to oyakōkō no ma de); Round 172: "A Scary Brother" (怖いお兄さん, Kowai onīsan); Round 173: "Carnival" (カーニバル, Kānibaru); Round 174: "The Throbbing Reminder" (疼きだした刻印, Uzuki dashita kokuin); Round 175: "The Nightmare in Mexico" (メキシコの悪夢, Mekishiko no akumu); Round 176: "For Me to be Me" (俺が俺であるために, Ore ga oredearu tame ni); Round 177: "The Power of a King" (王様の力, Ōsama no chikara); Round 178: "The Champion's Fist" (チャンピオンの拳, Chanpion no ken)
