= List of Hajime no Ippo volumes (21–40) =

Hajime no Ippo (はじめの一歩; lit. 'The First Step') is a Japanese boxing manga series written and illustrated by George Morikawa. It has been serialized by Kodansha in Weekly Shōnen Magazine since 1989 and collected in over 142 tankōbon to date. It follows the story of high school student Makunouchi Ippo, as he begins his career in boxing and over time obtains many titles and defeats various opponents.

== Volume list ==
No.	Japanese release date	Japanese ISBN
21	January 17, 1994	978-4-06-311975-6
Round 179: "Collected Feelings" (背負っている重さ, Shotte iru omo-sa); Round 180: "Forehead Wrinkles" (眉間のシワ, Miken no shiwa); Round 181: "Secret Fight Plan" (極秘の戦闘計画, Gokuhi no sentōkeikaku); Round 182: "Japanese Title Match Eve" (日本タイトルマッチ前夜, Nihon taitorumatchi zen'ya); Round 183: "Cover of the Decisive Battle" (決戦の火蓋, Kessen no hibuta); Round 184: "Conversation of Fists" (拳の会話, Ken no kaiwa); Round 185: "Explosion from Point-Blank Range" (至近距離の爆弾, Shikin kyori no bakudan); Round 186: "Ambush" (迎撃, Geigeki); Round 187: "Empty Response" (空虚な手応え, Kūkyona tegotae)
22	March 17, 1994	978-4-06-311994-7
Round 188: "Soft Defense" (柔構造の防御, Yawara kōzō no bōgyo); Round 189: "The Words of Foreman" (フォアマンの言葉, Foaman no kotoba); Round 190: "Angry God" (鬼神, Kishin); Round 191: "Wild Soul" (荒ぶる魂, Araburu tamashī); Round 192: "What is Searched for in the Ring" (リング上の探し物, Ringu-jō no sagashi-mono); Round 193: "Prohibited Finishing Blow" (禁断のフィニッシュブロー, Kindan no finisshuburō); Round 194: "5R 2 Minutes 32 Seconds" (5R2分32秒, 5 R 2-bu 32-byō); Round 195: "Returning Rival" (帰ってきた好敵手, Kaettekita raibaru); Round 196: "Rest" (休息, Kyūsoku)
23	June 17, 1994	978-4-06-312025-7
Round 197: "The View From High Above" (展望台からの風景, Tenbō-dai kara no fūkei); Round 198: "Playback" (再生, Saisei); Round 199: "Under the Tree of Memories" (思い出の樹の下で, Omoide no kinoshitade); Round 200: "The Tiger and the Wolf" (虎と狼, Tora to ōkami); Round 201: "Determination"; Round 202: "Last Card" (切り札, Kirifuda); Round 203: "Two Beasts" (二匹の獣, Ni-biki no kemono); Round 204: "Winner and Loser" (勝者と敗者, Shōsha to haisha); Round 205: "Sayonara" (サヨウナラ, Sayōnara)
24	August 17, 1994	978-4-06-312041-7
Round 206: "Return from Overseas" (凱旋, Gaisen); Round 207: "Height of Your Eyes" (目の高さ, Me no taka-sa); Round 208: "Nightmare" (悪夢, Akumu); Round 209: "An Unexpected Enemy" (思いがけない敵, Omoigakenai teki); Round 210: "Meeting in the Weighing Room" (計量室での出会い, Keiryō-shitsu de no deai); Round 211: "Time of Revival" (復活の時, Fukkatsu no toki); Round 212: "Control the Pace!" (主導権を握れ!, Shudō-ken o nigire!); Round 213: "Classic Blow" (古代のブロー, Kodai no burō); Round 214: "Mike Performance" (マイク·パフォーマンス, Maiku· pafōmansu)
25	November 17, 1994	978-4-06-312068-4
Round 215: "Takamura's Home Visit" (鷹村の家庭訪問, Takamura no katei hōmon); Round 216: "The 80's – A Time of Passion" (80年代――アツイ季節, 80-Nendai ―― atsui kisetsu); Round 217: "The First Disgrace" (初めての屈辱, Hajimete no kutsujoku); Round 218: "Counterattack for Two" (2人だけの逆襲, 2-Ri dake no gyakushū); Round 219: "Fists of a Boxer" (ボクサーの拳, Bokusā no ken); Round 220: "I'm Sure It Hit" (確かなる手応え, Tashikanaru tegotae); Round 221: "We Can't Turn Back" (もう戻りはしない, Mō modori wa shinai); Round 222: "5 Year Old Story" (5年前の話, 5-Nen mae no hanashi); Round 223: "Unfinished Fight" (終わってない試合, Owattenai shiai)
26	January 17, 1995	978-4-06-312090-5
Round 224: "Great Determination" (再挑戦決定, Sai chōsen kettei); Round 225: "The Old Man and the Bear" (老人と熊, Rōjin to kuma); Round 226: "Nekota-san's Advice" (猫田さんの助言, Nekoda-san no jogen); Round 227: "Ring in a Field" (焼け野原のリング, Yakenohara no ringu); Round 228: "Masu Boxing" (マス·ボクシング, Masu· bokushingu); Round 229: "Nekota-san's Advice 2" (猫田さんの助言2, Nekoda-san no jogen 2); Round 230: "Japan's Greatest Beast" (国内最強の獣, Kokunai saikyō no kemono); Round 231: "See You Again, Nekota-san" (See You Again 猫田さん, Shī You agein Nekoda-san); Round 232: "The Man Ranked 4th" (ランキング4位の男, Rankingu 4-i no otoko)
27	March 17, 1995	978-4-06-312112-4
Round 233: "Writer's Ambition" (ライター志望, Raitā shibō); Round 234: "Cat & Dog Come Again"; Round 235: "Shaking Hall" (揺れる後楽園, Yureru kōrakuen); Round 236: "He Who Rules With His Left" (左を制する者は...., Hidari o seisuru mono wa....); Round 237: "Paper" (色紙, Shikishi); Round 238: "Neko Express Delivery" (猫の宅配便, Neko no takuhaibin); Round 239: "Two Fighters" (2人のファイター, 2-Nin no faitā); Round 240: "Southpaw's Secret" (サウスポーの秘密, Sausupō no himitsu); Round 241: "Stadium in Despair" (絶望の府立体育館, Zetsubō no furitsu taiikukan)
28	May 17, 1995	978-4-06-312135-3
Round 242: "King's Farewell Gift" (王者の餞, Ōja no hanamuke); Round 243: "Punch Eye" (パンチ·アイ, Panchi· ai); Round 244: "Oath at the Zoo" (動物園の誓い, Dōbu~tsuen no chikai); Round 245: "Dojo Duels" (道場破り, Dōjōyaburi); Round 246: "Thug" (ゴンタ, Gonta); Round 247: "Dempsey Roll Counter Measure" (デンプシー·ロール対策, Denpushī· rōru taisaku); Round 248: "Sold Out"; Round 249: "Cheers of East and West" (東西の応援団!!, Tōzai no ōen-dan!!); Round 250: "The Tension of Red and Blue" (赤と青の緊張感, Aka to ao no kinchō-kan)
29	August 17, 1995	978-4-06-312165-0
Round 251: "Pulse" (鼓動); Round 252: "Count Down" (カウントダウン!); Round 253: "Astride Position" (アストライドポジション); Round 254: "Lallapallooza" (地鳴り(ララパルーザ)); Round 255: "Guarding Over Terror" (ガード越しの恐怖); Round 256: "Back Alley" (袋小路); Round 257: "The Greatest Weapon" (最大最強の武器); Round 258: "Dangerous Eyes" (危険な眼); Round 259: "Compensation" (代償)
30	November 16, 1995	978-4-06-312197-1
Round 260: "Proof of Being Japan's Best" (日本一の証明); Round 261: "Plan Blown to Pieces" (断ち切られた図式); Round 262: "Surpass the Past!!" ("あの時"を超えろ!!); Round 263: "Mix Up"; Round 264: "Premonition of Demise" (終焉の予感); Round 265: "Dead or Alive"; Round 266: "Observation" (刮目の瞬間); Round 267: "The Birth of a New King" (新王者誕生); Round 268: "The Feeling of Japan's Best" (日本一の実感)
31	January 17, 1996	978-4-06-312219-0
Round 269: "Greatest Day of My Life" (人生最良の日); Round 270: "The Reason For Goodbye" (サヨナラの理由); Round 271: "Help!"; Round 272: "His Dejection" (コウモリ男の憂鬱); Round 273: "Lesson in Silence" (無言の教え); Round 274: "The Future Weapon" (その先にある武器); Round 275: "What the Fish Taught Me" (魚が教えてくれたもの); Round 276: "Returning Fugitive" (帰ってきた逃亡者); Round 277: "Kimura's Decision" (木村の決意)
32	March 16, 1996	978-4-06-312241-1
Round 278: "Shining Ring" (眩いリング); Round 279: "God of Death" (死神の鎌); Round 280: "Father and Son" (父と子); Round 281: "Cold Sweat" (冷たい汗); Round 282: "Premonition of Danger" (危険な伏線); Round 283: "Blind Spot" (死角); Round 284: "Sister!" (妹よ!); Round 285: "Greatest Challenger" (最強の挑戦者); Round 286: "If This Fist Can Reach" (この拳が届けば....); Round 287: "Scene of Carnage" (修羅の如く)
33	May 16, 1996	978-4-06-312265-7
Round 288: "Time of Parting" (訣別の時); Round 289: "Boxing Junkie" (ボクシング中毒); Round 290: "The Man of the Junior Feathers" (J·フェザーの男); Round 291: "Two Sparrows" (2羽の燕); Round 292: "Hien and Tsubame Gaeshi" (飛燕と燕返し); Round 293: "Super Doctor S" (スーパードクター·S); Round 294: "Over the Top"; Round 295: "Inexperienced Determination" (青い決心); Round 296: "Ippo Be..."
34	August 12, 1996	978-4-06-312299-2
Round 297: "Palpation" (触診); Round 298: "Rival" (親友); Round 299: "Importance of Red" (赤の重み); Round 300: "Like a Green Boy"; Round 301: "Opening Hit" (最初の一発); Round 302: "The Blue Corner's Preparations" (青コーナーの伏線); Round 303: "Dempsey Roll Vs Hien" (デンプシー·ロールVS飛燕); Round 304: "Slipping Past" (スリ抜けた拳); Round 305: "Mexico and 7 Centimeters" (メキシコと7センチ); Round 306: "Close Range" (大接近)
35	October 17, 1996	978-4-06-312325-8
Round 307: "Eye of the Storm" (台風の目); Round 308: "Vital Points" (人体の急所); Round 309: "Release from Hell" (地獄からの解放); Round 310: "Banzai Attack" (バンザイ·アタック); Round 311: "Dempsey Roll at the Limits" (極限のデンプシー·ロール); Round 312: "When the Last Fist Falls" (最後の拳をふるう者); Round 313: "Championship Belt" (チャンピオン·ベルト); Round 314: "Pray for the Great Mountain" (願わくば大きな山に); Round 315: "Un-Surrendered Weight Class" (ゆずれない階級)
36	January 17, 1997	978-4-06-312361-6
Round 316: "'Crocodile' Landing" ("クロコダイル"上陸); Round 317: "An Oath Made on the Counter" (瞬殺(カウンター)にかけた誓い); Round 318: "Other Worldly Speed" (異次元のスピード); Round 319: "The Moment the Cross is Painted" (十字架を描く時); Round 320: "Bloody Cross"; Round 321: "A Fist that is Alive and A Fist that is Dead" (生きた拳と死んだ拳); Round 322: "An Unfulfilled Oath" (果たせぬ誓い); Round 323: "Take This Thought!" (とどけ、この思い!); Round 324: "Energy For One Hit" (一発分のエネルギー)
37	April 17, 1997	978-4-06-312390-6
Round 325: "Revived! Rival's Fists" (甦れ!ライバルの拳); Round 326: "Towards the World" (世界への胎動); Round 327: "Secret Expectation" (密かなる期待); Round 328: "Against the World's Strongest" (世界最強との差); Round 329: "Unreachable Summit" (高すぎる頂点); Round 330: "World Class Vessel" (ワールド·クラスの器); Round 331: "7 Year Focus" (7年越しの焦点); Round 332: "Silence Before the Storm" (嵐の前の戦場); Round 333: "Magnificent Beginning" (華麗なる幕開け); Round 334: "Style of the Golden Years" (全盛期のスタイル)
38	June 17, 1997	978-4-06-312417-0
Round 335: "Abominable Second Round" (忌まわしの第2R); Round 336: "Devil's Back" (Devil's Back (悪魔の降臨)); Round 337: "Broken Heart" (壊れかけのハート); Round 338: "Date Eiji's Identity" (伊達英二の証明); Round 339: "Farewell, Samurai" (さらばサムライ); Round 340: "Tragic Baton Pass" (悲壮なバトンタッチ); Round 341: "Ippo-Senpai's Task" (一歩先輩の課題); Round 342: "Complicated Fists" (錯綜する拳); Round 343: "Cowardly Champion" (ふぬけた王者)
39	August 12, 1997	978-4-06-312439-2
Round 344: "Underdog's Dream" (噛ませ犬の夢); Round 345: "Decisive Meeting" (決意の再会); Round 346: "Yamada Naomichi's Confession" (山田直道の告白); Round 347: "Raising of the Curtain" (手荒い開幕); Round 348: "The Reversal of the Angy God" (鬼神の裏側); Round 349: "Irritated Combination" (焦燥の連打); Round 350: "Terms of Being a Pro" (プロの条件); Round 351: "Solar Plexis Blow" (ソーラー·プロキサス·ブロー); Round 352: "Life-Threatening Revenge" (捨て身のリベンジ)
40	November 17, 1997	978-4-06-312475-0
Round 353: "Towards the Longed For" (想望なる先輩へ); Round 354: "Much Stronger" (今日よりずっと); Round 355: "Encounter at the Beach" (海での遭遇); Round 356: "Exclamation on the Beach" (絶叫のビーチ); Round 357: "Meager Satisfaction" (ささやかな満足); Round 358: "The Spirit of Number 2" (No.2の気骨); Round 359: "The Bright Stars"; Round 360: "Powerful Youth" (怪童現る); Round 361: "Bloodlust" (殺気)
