= Hajime no Ippo =

Japanese manga series and its adaptation

- First tankōbon volume cover, featuring Ippo Makunouchi

はじめの一歩
- Genre: Action; Comedy; Sports
- Manga
- Written by: George Morikawa
- Published by: Kodansha
- English publisher: Kodansha (digital); NA: Kodansha USA
- Imprint: Shōnen Magazine Comics
- Magazine: Weekly Shōnen Magazine
- Original run: October 11, 1989 – present
- Volumes: 145
Further information
Anime television series
Directed by	Satoshi Nishimura
Produced by	Hiroshi Yamashita; Mitsuru Ohshima; Manabu Tamura; Masao Maruyama
Written by	Tatsuhiko Urahata
Music by	Tsuneo Imahori
Studio	Madhouse
Licensed by	NA: Geneon (former); Discotek Media (current)
Original network	Nippon TV
Original run	October 4, 2000 – March 27, 2002
Episodes	76
Anime television film
Hajime no Ippo: Champion Road
Directed by	Satoshi Nishimura
Produced by	Hiroshi Yamashita; Manabu Tamura; Masao Maruyama
Written by	Kazuyuki Fudeyasu
Music by	Tsuneo Imahori
Studio	Madhouse
Licensed by	NA: Geneon (former); Discotek Media (current)
Original network	Nippon TV
Released	April 18, 2003
Runtime	90 minutes
Original video animation
Hajime no Ippo: Mashiba vs. Kimura
Directed by	Hitoshi Nanba
Produced by	Hiroshi Yamashita; Manabu Tamura; Masao Maruyama
Written by	Tatsuhiko Urahata
Music by	Tsuneo Imahori
Studio	Madhouse
Licensed by	NA: Discotek Media
Released	September 5, 2003
Runtime	60 minutes
Anime television series
Hajime no Ippo: New Challenger
Directed by	Jun Shishido
Produced by	Toshio Nakatani; Manabu Tamura
Written by	Kazuyuki Fudeyasu
Music by	Yoshihisa Hirano
Studio	Madhouse
Licensed by	Netflix (streaming)
Original network	Nippon TV
Original run	January 6, 2009 – June 30, 2009
Episodes	26
Anime television series
Hajime no Ippo: Rising
Directed by	Jun Shishido
Produced by	Toshio Nakatani; Manabu Tamura; Tomohiro Shindo
Written by	Kazuyuki Fudeyasu
Music by	Yoshihisa Hirano; Tsuneo Imahori
Studio	Madhouse; MAPPA
Licensed by	Crunchyroll (streaming; former); Netflix (streaming; current)
Original network	Nippon TV
Original run	October 5, 2013 – March 29, 2014
Episodes	25
- icon

Hajime no Ippo (はじめの一歩; lit. 'The First Step') is a Japanese boxing-themed manga series written and illustrated by George Morikawa. It has been serialized in Kodansha's shōnen manga magazine Weekly Shōnen Magazine since October 1989, with its chapters collected in 145 tankōbon volumes as of January 2026. It follows the story of high school student Ippo Makunouchi, as he begins his career in boxing and over time obtains many titles and defeats various opponents.

A 76-episode anime adaptation produced by Madhouse aired on Nippon TV from October 2000 to March 2002. A television film and an original video animation (OVA) were released in 2003. A second series titled Hajime no Ippo: New Challenger aired from January to June 2009. A third series Hajime no Ippo: Rising aired from October 2013 to March 2014.

In North America, the first series, including the television film, was licensed by Geneon in 2003, which released it under the name Fighting Spirit. It was re-licensed by Discotek Media in 2020, including the television film and the OVA.

By July 2023, the manga had over 100 million copies in circulation, making it one of the best-selling manga series of all time. In 1991, Hajime no Ippo won the 15th Kodansha Manga Award in the shōnen category.

== Plot ==
Ippo Makunouchi is a shy high school student who is unable to make friends due to always being busy helping his mother run their family fishing charter business. Because he kept to himself, a group of bullies led by Umezawa got into the habit of picking on him. One day, when these bullies gave him a rather serious beating, a middleweight professional boxer who was passing by stopped them and took the injured Ippo to the Kamogawa Gym (鴨川ボクシングジム, Kamogawa Bokushingu Jimu), owned by retired boxer Genji Kamogawa, to treat his wounds. After Ippo awoke to the sounds of boxers training, the boxer who saved him, Mamoru Takamura, tried to cheer Ippo up by letting him vent his frustrations on a sandbag. It was then that they had their first glimpse into Ippo's talent for boxing. After that incident, Ippo gave the situation a lot of thought and decided that he would like to begin a career as a professional boxer. When he conveys this message to Mamoru Takamura, he gets verbally reprimanded: Takamura thought Ippo was taking professional boxing too lightly. However, Takamura felt that he couldn't outright refuse Ippo, especially since his feat of punching the sandbag much harder than anybody else in the gym (except for Takamura). Therefore, he challenges Ippo to catch 10 falling leaves from a tree simultaneously after a week of training, fully convinced that Ippo would fail, Takamura jogs away as he continues his roadwork.

However, after a week of tough training, involving nightly hours, Ippo manages the technique in the nick of time. He waits for the jogging Takamura to come by his usual path and surprises him by catching all 10 of the falling leaves and only doing so with his left hand. This impresses Takamura greatly, and he informs Ippo that the action required to catch all 10 leaves is called a boxing jab. Takamura invites Ippo back to the boxing gym for introductions.

When they got back to the gym, the coach, Genji Kamogawa, was not at all impressed by Makunouchi's lack of fighting spirit, and therefore, was challenged by Takamura to have a practice spar against a member of the gym. However, Kamogawa decides to give Ippo a severe challenge and tells him to spar with Ichiro Miyata, who is 16, the same age as Ippo. Miyata is known as a boxing prodigy and is one of Kamogawa gym's future hopes. Takamura gets extremely worried with this prospect, as Miyata skill is way above the four-rounder pro boxer. As expected, Ippo loses by KO, but not until Miyata struggles dodging his punches and finally ends the match with his trump card: "The Counter". Coach Kamogawa decides that he has great fighting sense and spirit and decides to train him to eventually become the Japanese champion with a world ranking while Miyata became the OPBF (Oriental Pacific Boxing Federation) Champion. Both are expected to hit high in the rankings and, eventually, fight each other for the world champion's belt.

The story focuses heavily on character development—even during the matches something is learned about both fighters. Ippo has a habit of running into his opponents before matches, giving him a chance to learn more about their backgrounds and even sympathize with them. Ippo is an extremely timid and modest person who never assumes that he is strong enough. He instead draws courage from seeing the strength of his opponent and realizing that he is able to stand up to it. Ippo and his friendly rivalry with Miyata is the main draw in the early part of the series. That later changes to Ippo's path toward the Japanese Featherweight Championship and eventually the world championship. Along the way the audience is given glimpses into the other characters' pasts, motivations, relationships to others, and current boxing trials. A colorful cast of supporting characters and opponents as well as side stories concerning their paths in the boxing world rounds out the series.

== Media ==
=== Manga ===
Written and illustrated by George Morikawa, Hajime no Ippo has been published in Kodansha's shōnen manga magazine Weekly Shōnen Magazine since October 11, 1989. It has run in the magazine for over 30 years, and reached its 1000th chapter in December 2012. It became one of the longest running manga series with over 1,500 chapters released in Japan by 2025. Kodansha has collected its chapters into individual tankōbon volumes. The first volume was published on February 17, 1990. As of January 16, 2026, 145 volumes have been published. In June 2021, it was announced that the series would get a digital release, for the first time in 33 years of publication, starting on July 1 of the same year.

Kodansha started publishing the series digitally in English on its K Manga service, with the first ten volumes (first 87 chapters) released in September 2023 and new chapters released every week. In August 2026, Kodansha USA announced that it will release the manga in a 3-in-1 volume omnibus edition starting in Q4 2027.

=== Anime ===
Hajime no Ippo has been adapted into an anime series franchise. The first 75-episode anime television series, produced by Madhouse, Nippon Television and VAP and directed by Satoshi Nishimura, aired on Nippon TV between October 4, 2000, and March 27, 2002. The episodes were collected into twenty-five DVDs released by VAP from March 16, 2001, to March 21, 2003. The last DVD includes a special episode which did not air in Japan, numbered 76. A television film titled Hajime no Ippo: Champion Road aired on April 18, 2003. An original video animation (OVA) titled Hajime no Ippo Mashiba vs. Kimura was released on September 5, 2003.

A second series titled Hajime no Ippo: New Challenger aired on Nippon TV from January 6 to June 30, 2009.

In 2009, Rikiya Koyama, the voice actor of Mamoru Takamura, revealed on his blog that a sequel to the Hajime no Ippo: New Challenger television series was being planned. In July 2013, it was reported in that a third season of Hajime no Ippo would air in 2013. The third season, titled Hajime no Ippo: Rising, ran for 25 episodes from October 5, 2013, to March 29, 2014.

==== English release ====
In North America, the first series was licensed by Geneon Entertainment in 2003, which released it under the name Fighting Spirit. Geneon distributed Fighting Spirit on 15 DVDs with five episodes per disc. The first DVD was released on July 6, 2004, and the fifteenth released on December 19, 2006. The TV film Champion Road was released on North America on January 9, 2007. There were no plans to release the OVA, Mashiba vs. Kimura. Disc sales of the series did not perform well. In September 2020, Discotek Media announced that it had licensed the series, including the 76 episodes, Champion Road and, for the first time in North America, the OVA Mashiba vs. Kimura. The first Blu-ray Disc set (episodes 1–24) was released on January 26, 2021; the second set (episodes 25–48) was released on March 30, 2021; and the third set (episodes 49–76, Mashiba vs. Kimura, and Champion Road) was released on October 26, 2021.

Hajime no Ippo: Rising started streaming on Crunchyroll in 2013, and the first series (including its 76th episode) was added to the platform in 2021; Rising has since been removed from the platform. In June 2024, Netflix started streaming the 75 episodes of the first television series, in Japanese with English subtitles and with the original English dub, and the 76th episode only in Japanese with English subtitles. In January 2025, Netflix started streaming New Challenger and Rising, making New Challenger officially available for the first time in English.

==== Music ====
The music for the first anime series was composed by Tsuneo Imahori, who also did the third opening theme song. Tracks of guitars, drums, piano, horns, and combinations of the instruments were used to help accentuate the mood and action of the scenes. The soundtrack was released in Japan on two CDs, First KO and Final Round. The music for the second series was composed by Yoshihisa Hirano. In the third series, Yoshihisa Hirano and Tsuneo Imahori are credited for the music.

===== Anime theme songs =====
Opening theme songs

1. "Under Star" by Shocking Lemon (episodes 1–25)
2. "Inner Light" by Shocking Lemon (episodes 26–50, TV movie)
3. "Tumbling Dice" by Tsuneo Imahori (episodes 51–76)
4. "Hekireki" by Last Alliance (episodes 77–102)
5. "Yakan Hikou" by Wasureranneyo (episodes 103–127)

Ending theme songs

1. "Yuuzora no Kamihikouki" by Mori Naoya (episodes 1–25, TV movie)
2. "360°" by Mori Naoya (episodes 26–50, 75, OVA)
3. "Eternal Loop" by Saber Tiger (episodes 51–74, 76)
4. "8AM" by Coldrain (episodes 77–102)
5. "Buchikome!!" by Shikuramen (episodes 103–127)

=== Video games ===
A total of nine video games based on the series have been released, included on the PlayStation, PlayStation 2, Game Boy Advance, Wii, PlayStation Portable, Nintendo DS, and PlayStation 3. Three of the games have been released in North America and in PAL territories.

Ippo and Takamura have also appeared in the 2009 crossover video game Sunday vs Magazine: Shūketsu! Chōjō Daikessen as playable characters.

Game	Details
Hajime no Ippo: The Fighting! Original release date(s): JP: July 31, 1997	Release years by system: 1997—PlayStation
Hajime no Ippo: The Fighting! Original release date(s): JP: July 31, 1997	Notes: Published by Kodansha.
Victorious Boxers: Ippo's Road to Glory Original release date(s): JP: December 14, 2000; EU: 2001; NA: November 5, 2001	Release years by system: 2000—PlayStation 2
Victorious Boxers: Ippo's Road to Glory Original release date(s): JP: December 14, 2000; EU: 2001; NA: November 5, 2001	Notes: Published by Entertainment Software Publishing
Hajime no Ippo: The Fighting! Original release date(s): JP: December 12, 2002	Release years by system: 2002—Game Boy Advance
Hajime no Ippo: The Fighting! Original release date(s): JP: December 12, 2002	Notes: Published by Entertainment Software Publishing.
Hajime no Ippo 2: Victorious Road Original release date(s): JP: January 29, 2004	Release years by system: 2004—PlayStation 2
Hajime no Ippo 2: Victorious Road Original release date(s): JP: January 29, 2004	Notes: Published by Entertainment Software Publishing.
Victorious Boxers 2: Fighting Spirit Original release date(s): JP: December 28, 2004; EU: August 26, 2005; NA: November 20, 2006	Release years by system: 2004—PlayStation 2
Victorious Boxers 2: Fighting Spirit Original release date(s): JP: December 28, 2004; EU: August 26, 2005; NA: November 20, 2006	Notes: Known in Japan as Hajime no Ippo: All Stars (はじめの一歩 ALL☆STARS).; Published by Entertainment Software Publishing.
Victorious Boxers: Revolution Original release date(s): JP: June 21, 2007; NA: October 16, 2007; EU: April 11, 2008	Release years by system: 2007—Wii
Victorious Boxers: Revolution Original release date(s): JP: June 21, 2007; NA: October 16, 2007; EU: April 11, 2008	Notes: Known in Japan as Hajime no Ippo: Revolution (はじめの一歩レボリューション) and in Europe as Victorious Boxers: Challenge.; Published by AQ Interactive.
Hajime no Ippo: Portable Victorious Spirits Original release date(s): JP: December 20, 2007	Release years by system: 2007—PSP
Hajime no Ippo: Portable Victorious Spirits Original release date(s): JP: December 20, 2007	Notes: Published by D3 Publisher.
Hajime no Ippo: The Fighting! DS Original release date(s): JP: December 4, 2008	Release years by system: 2008—Nintendo DS
Hajime no Ippo: The Fighting! DS Original release date(s): JP: December 4, 2008	Notes: Published by D3 Publisher.
Hajime no Ippo: The Fighting! Original release date(s): JP: December 11, 2014	Release years by system: 2014—PlayStation 3
Hajime no Ippo: The Fighting! Original release date(s): JP: December 11, 2014	Notes: Published by Bandai Namco Games

== Reception ==
Hajime no Ippo won the 15th Kodansha Manga Award in the shōnen category in 1991. In 2019, the series received a Special Award at the 43rd Kodansha Manga Award, commemorating 110 years since Kodansha's founding. On TV Asahi's Manga Sōsenkyo 2021 poll, in which 150,000 people voted for their top 100 manga series, Hajime no Ippo ranked 47th.

By September 2008, the Hajime no Ippo manga had over 73 million copies in circulation. By November 2019, it had over 96 million copies in circulation. By July 2023, it had over 100 million copies in circulation.

Anime Academy gave the first anime series a glowing response; all five reviewers rated it above 90%, with one referring to the series as "the cream of the crop" of the sports genre in anime, and another stating that "fighting and character development have never tangoed so well together". Gia Manry of Fanboy.com listed the series as one of their "Top Ten Underrated Manga". IGN listed Hajime no Ippo: Rising among the best anime series of the 2010s.

== See also ==
- List of boxing films
