= George Morikawa =

Japanese manga artist

- Born: January 17, 1966 (age 60) Tokyo, Japan
- Area: Manga artist
- Notable works: Hajime no Ippo
- Awards: Kodansha Manga Award in shōnen

George Morikawa (森川 常次 (stylized as ジョージ), Morikawa Jōji; born January 17, 1966) is a Japanese manga author known for the long-running series Hajime no Ippo.

== Biography ==
=== Early Life ===
Born in Tokyo, Morikawa was inspired to become a manga artist upon reading Tetsuya Chiba's Harris no Kaze in elementary school.

=== Career ===
He was previously an assistant to Shuichi Shigeno, while known manga artist Kentaro Miura and Kaori Saki were past assistants to him.

In 1989, Morikawa released his magnum opus series, Hajime no Ippo. As of January 2026, has released 145 tankōbon volumes. It has been adapted into several anime series, the first of which began airing in 2000 and was produced by Madhouse studio. The first series contains 76 episodes, while the second series, which started in 2009, contains 26. The third series, named Hajime no Ippo: Rising, was produced in 2013 and contains 25 episodes.

Morikawa won the Kodansha Manga Award in 1991 for Hajime no Ippo.

He is also the owner of JB Sports Gym in Tokyo.

== Works ==
- Inside Graffiti
- Silhouette Night (シルエットナイト) (1983)
- Kazuya Now (一矢NOW) (1986) (2 volumes)
- Signal Blue (シグナルブルー) (1986) (2 volumes)
- Hajime no Ippo (はじめの一歩) (1989–present, Kodansha) (145 volumes)
- I'll be Seeing You! (会いにいくよ, Ai ni Ikuyo) (2012) (1 volume)
