= List of Berserk (1997 TV series) episodes =

First DVD cover, featuring Guts

The 1997 Berserk anime series is based on the manga series Berserk by Kentaro Miura. The episodes are directed by Naohito Takahashi and animated by Oriental Light and Magic. The first thirteen volumes of the manga are covered. The series' twenty-five episodes aired between October 8, 1997, and April 1, 1998, in Japan on Nippon TV. (Note: Berserk aired on Nippon TV on Tuesday midnight, effectively Wednesday at 1:45 a.m. JST.)

The series focuses on the life of Guts, an orphaned mercenary warrior who calls himself "The Black Swordsman", as he looks upon his days serving as a member of a group of mercenaries, the Band of the Hawk. Led by an ambitious, ruthless, yet intelligent and graceful man named Griffith, together they battle their way into the royal court, and are forced into a fate that may change their entire lives. Each episode uses two pieces of theme music, one opening theme and one ending theme. The opening theme is "Tell Me Why" by Penpals. The ending theme is "Waiting So Long" by Silver Fins.

== Episodes ==
No.	Title (Note: All English titles are taken from the Berserk Collector's Edition Blu-ray DVD.)	Directed by	Written by	Original release date
1	"The Black Swordsman"; Transliteration: "Kuroi Kenshi" (Japanese: 黒い剣士)	Kazuya Tsurumaki	Atsuhiro Tomioka	October 8, 1997
A girl is being assaulted in a bar when Guts walks in. He kills all the assailants but one and orders him to tell his master, the Baron, that the Black Swordsman is coming. Guts later finds and kills the Baron, and removes a demonic relic called a Behelit from around his neck. Soon after, Guts remembers the events in his past of when he fought the knight Basuzo.
2	"The Band of the Hawk"; Transliteration: "Taka no Dan" (Japanese: 鷹の団)	Masakazu Amiya	Yukiyoshi Ōhashi	October 15, 1997
In a flashback, Guts remembers when as a mercenary he killed the knight Basuzo. Later he encounters the group who would change his destiny: the Band of the Hawk. Corkus attempts to rob Guts and Griffith sends Casca to help him, but Guts defeats her. Guts then challenges Griffith, who grievously wounds him. Griffith orders Casca to lie with Guts during his convalescence. When Guts recovers days later, Griffith asks the swordsman to join his group but again he challenges Griffith to a sword fight.
3	"First Battle"; Transliteration: "Uijin" (Japanese: 初陣)	Kazuhisa Ōno	Makoto Itakura	October 22, 1997
Griffith defeats Guts, and makes him a member of the Band of the Hawk – an alliance between the philosopher and the berserker. The Hawks go on a midnight raid and Griffith chooses Guts for the most important position of rear guard; Guts succeeds and the band hails him as a hero.
4	"The Hand of God"; Transliteration: "Kami no Te" (Japanese: 神の手)	Yasuhiro Geshi	Shōji Yonemura	October 29, 1997
Guts settles in with the Band of the Hawk, and Griffith shows him his Behelit. Guts remembers his childhood, being raised by his adoptive father and mentor Gambino. The young Guts was forced to kill Gambino when he tried to kill the boy he blamed for his wife's death. Three years pass and the Band of the Hawk grow in power and numbers.
5	"A Wind of Swords"; Transliteration: "Kenpū" (Japanese: 剣風)	Mihiro Yamaguchi	Shinzō Fujita	November 5, 1997
Guts is now a commander in Griffith's army. Guts is taking risks in battle, and although he succeeds, Casca takes him to task for it. Eventually, Griffith is knighted as a viscount in the Midland court to the nobles' dismay. Guts saves the Hawks in battle, to Casca's chagrin.
6	"Zodd the Immortal"; Transliteration: "Fushi no Zoddo" (Japanese: 不死のゾッド)	Yasuhiro Matsumura	Atsuhiro Tomioka	November 12, 1997
Guts leads his men to raid a castle under Tudor occupation, but his men are wiped out by Nosferatu Zodd the Immortal, a fearsome giant monstrous warrior. Guts enters the castle keep and engages Zodd in battle. When Guts manages to stab him, Zodd transforms into his 300-year-old demon form. Zodd nearly kills Guts before Griffith and a group of Hawks comes to his aid, but they are ineffective. When Zodd is about to kill Griffith he sees the Behelit and ceases his attack. He then sprouts wings and flies off, telling Guts that should Griffith's dream die, it will be his doom.
7	"The Sword's Owner"; Transliteration: "Tsurugi no Aruji" (Japanese: 剣の主)	Masakazu Amiya	Yukiyoshi Ōhashi	November 19, 1997
Though he and Guts are still injured from their encounter with Nosferatu Zodd, Griffith uses it to get closer to the King and his daughter Charlotte. Guts and some of the Hawks feel that Griffith is pulling away from them.
8	"Conspiracy"; Transliteration: "Inbō" (Japanese: 陰謀)	Kōji Yoshikawa	Makoto Itakura	November 26, 1997
Griffith and Guts continue to have success in battle and Griffith is made a count. The king's brother, General Julius, is furious about this as he and Minister Foss plot Griffith's murder with a poison arrow during an upcoming hunt.
9	"Assassination"; Transliteration: "Ansatsu" (Japanese: 暗殺)	Yukina Hiiro	Shōji Yonemura	December 3, 1997
During the hunt, Griffith and Charlotte grow close before the former is shot in the chest with a poisoned arrow. Luckily, Griffith's Behelit takes the arrow and he survives unscathed. Griffith deduces Julius to be the culprit and recruits Guts to secretly kill the noble.
10	"Noble Man"; Transliteration: "Tōtoki Mono" (Japanese: 貴きもの)	Yukio Okazaki	Shinzō Fujita	December 10, 1997
Guts assassinates Julius, but is emotionally scarred when forced to kill Julius' son Adonis to conceal the deed. Later, he hears Griffith tell Charlotte that he would consider a true friend to be his equal, someone with his own dreams and who follows his own path. Guts realises that although he is close to Griffith, he is not his friend.
11	"The Battle"; Transliteration: "Kassen" (Japanese: 合戦)	Yasuhiro Matsumura	Atsuhiro Tomioka	December 17, 1997
Griffith and the Hawks lead the march into battle against the Blue Whale Knights. Casca has a fever, and after fighting with Adon Coborlwitz she falls unconscious off a cliff, Guts goes after her. They are washed downriver, and Guts finds a cave where he must keep Casca warm with his body.
12	"Together"; Transliteration: "Futari" (Japanese: ふたり)	Masakazu Amiya	Yukiyoshi Ōhashi	December 24, 1997
Guts tends to Casca but she still resents him. She tells her story of how Griffith helped her save herself from being raped, and give her a choice in life so she followed him. She watched him pragmatically go with a pederast lord to earn money to create his army and fulfill his dream. When Guts came, she knew that she would not be Griffith's chosen friend.
13	"Prepared for Death"; Transliteration: "Kesshikō" (Japanese: 決死行)	Mihiro Yamaguchi	Makoto Itakura	January 7, 1998
Adon Coborlwitz and his Blue Whale Knights find Guts and Casca. Though completely outnumbered, Guts tells Casca to run and stays to fight. Some men go after Casca, catching her and holding her down in order to rape her. Guts continues fighting.
14	"Bonfire of Dreams"; Transliteration: "Yume no Kagaribi" (Japanese: 夢のかがり火)	Kōji Yoshikawa	Shōji Yonemura	January 14, 1998
Guts eventually slays 100 men, including Adon's younger brother, Samson. Casca defeats her attackers too, and she and Guts end up back at the camp. Guts and Casca share a tender moment, where Guts explains that everyone in the camp has a dream but all he has is his sword, causing Casca to think he is leaving.
15	"The Decisive Battle"; Transliteration: "Kessen" (Japanese: 決戦)	Yukio Okazaki	Shinzō Fujita	January 21, 1998
Griffith volunteers the Hawks to reclaim the impregnable Fortress of Doldrey from a Tudor governor named Gannon and the Purple Rhino Knights in his service. Guts learns that Griffith's unsavory history was with Gannon when he was a noble. The Hawks begin their assault before pulling back. Their boats are burned and there is nowhere to retreat to as the Tudor army leaves the fortress in pursuit.
16	"The Conqueror"; Transliteration: "Shōrisha" (Japanese: 勝利者)	Yukina Hiiro	Atsuhiro Tomioka	January 28, 1998
The retreat was a ruse and Casca takes the fortress, defeating Adon and the few remaining guards. Guts fights with the Rhino Knights' command Boscogn before his sword breaks, only to gain a sword that was provided by Zodd from a great distance. Guts uses the sword to kill Boscogn while Griffith kills a wounded Gannon to assure the Hawks' victory.
17	"Moment of Glory"; Transliteration: "Eikō no Shunkan" (Japanese: 栄光の瞬間)	Yasuhiro Matsumura	Yukiyoshi Ōhashi	February 4, 1998
The Hawks' reclaiming of Doldrey marks the end of the Hundred-Year War between Midland and Tudor. The King holds a ball for the mercenaries in their honor. The Queen, Charlotte's stepmother and Julius's secret lover, hatches a scheme with Foss to poison Griffith during the banquet. However, before the event, Foss receives a disturbing letter. During the toast, Griffith falls to the floor.
18	"Tombstone of Flames"; Transliteration: "Honoo no Bohyō" (Japanese: 炎の墓標)	Masakazu Amiya	Makoto Itakura	February 11, 1998
The Queen and the conspirators believe they succeeded in poisoning Griffith and that he is dead. However, while they are celebrating, their room is locked and the tower is engulfed in flames. Griffith is still alive and watches them burn, having forced Foss to aid him by kidnapping his daughter. Griffith has again used Guts to remove his competition. Guts decides to leave and tells a pleading Casca that he does not want to be caught up in Griffith's dream anymore.
19	"Separation"; Transliteration: "Wakare" (Japanese: 別れ)	Mihiro Yamaguchi	Shōji Yonemura	February 18, 1998
As Guts leaves, he is challenged by Griffith and manages to defeat him and earn his freedom. However, Guts' departure affects Griffith psychologically and he spends a night of passion with Charlotte in a lapse of judgement. When Griffith leaves the next morning, he is apprehended and arrested by the guards.
20	"Sparks"; Transliteration: "Hibana" (Japanese: 火花)	Kōji Yoshikawa	Shinzō Fujita	February 25, 1998
A year has passed and Guts is living with Godot, a swordsmith, and his granddaughter Erica. Guts learns that the Band of the Hawk are now wanted outlaws and Casca is their captain. Guts goes to them and finds them battling foreign mercenaries.
21	"Confession"; Transliteration: "Kokuhaku" (Japanese: 告白)	Yukio Okazaki	Shinzō Fujita	March 4, 1998
Guts helps the Hawks drive off the mercenaries. Casca has a plan to rescue Griffith from the Tower of Rebirth in the Wyndham Castle where he is being held. Casca blames Guts for Griffith's problems, but realizes it is not his fault. They make love and Guts asks her to go away with him after the rescue.
22	"Infiltration"; Transliteration: "Sennyū" (Japanese: 潜入)	Yukina Hiiro	Makoto Itakura	March 11, 1998
Casca and Guts go into the dungeon under the Tower of Rebirth to rescue Griffith, finding him mute, crippled and horribly disfigured from a year of seemingly endless torture. Meanwhile, the members of the Hawk are slaughtered at their camp by monsters led by a green fairy.
23	"Eve of the Feast"; Transliteration: "Zenyasai" (Japanese: 前夜祭)	Kōji Fukazawa	Shōji Yonemura	March 18, 1998
Back at the camp, everyone is forlorn because of Griffith's terrible condition. The Raiders ask Guts to take them along with him. Casca feels she must take care of Griffith, and tells Guts to leave. Delirious and horrified at what he has been reduced to, Griffith takes off in a wagon and crashes into the river. He finds his Behelit and unintentionally activates it, taking everyone present to the Astral Realm.
24	"The Great Eclipse"; Transliteration: "Shoku" (Japanese: 蝕)	Masakazu Amiya	Yukiyoshi Ōhashi	March 25, 1998
The four archdemons of the God Hand awake and inform Griffith that he has been chosen to be their final member. For his baptism, Griffith must offer his friends as a sacrifice to the God Hand's Apostles. Griffith is shown visions of his past to convince him that the lives of his men are trivial in regard to the fulfillment of his dream. Guts climbs a mountain of flesh to try and stop Griffith from becoming a demon, but Griffith accepts the God Hand's offer. The entire Band of Hawk are branded as sacrificial offerings for the unborn child of darkness, Griffith.
25	"Time of Eternity"; Transliteration: "Eien no Toki" (Japanese: 永遠の刻)	Naohito Takahashi	Shinzō Fujita	April 1, 1998
The Apostles assume their true forms and commence the Eclipse feasting by devouring those branded as offerings. Griffith is reborn as the fifth God Hand, Femto, and rapes Casca in front of Guts. Guts is forced to cut off his left forearm to stop his former friend while his right eye is gouged out. A post-credits scene shows Guts in the physical world with his wounds healed as he leaves Godo's house to exact his revenge on Griffith and the Apostles ending the series on a cliffhanger.

== See also ==
- List of Berserk (2016) episodes
- List of Berserk chapters
