= List of Berserk chapters =

Cover for the 2016 edition of volume 1, featuring Guts

Berserk is a Japanese manga series created by Kentaro Miura, published by Hakusensha in the magazines Monthly Animal House (1989–1992) and Young Animal (since 1992). Since the late 2000s, the manga has been published irregularly, with frequent hiatuses. Following Miura's death in 2021, the series has been continued and supervised by Miura's friend, Kouji Mori, and drawn by Studio Gaga, consisting of Miura's assistants and apprentices.

The story follows Guts, an orphaned mercenary on his quest for revenge, and consists of five major story arcs: "The Black Swordsman Arc" (Note: 黒い剣士篇, Kuroi Kenshi-hen) (volumes 1–3); "Golden Age Arc" (Note: 黄金時代篇, Ōgon Jidai-hen) (volumes 3–14); "Conviction Arc" (Note: 断罪篇, Danzai-hen) (volumes 14–21); "Falcon of the Millennium Empire Arc" (Note: 千年王国の鷹(ミレニアム・ファルコン)編, Mireniamu Farukon-hen; lit. 'Millennium Falcon Arc') (volumes 22–35); and "Fantasia Arc" (Note: 幻造世界(ファンタジア)編, Fantajia-hen) (volumes 35–).

The chapters (called "episodes") are collected by Hakusensha in tankōbon volumes, with the first volume released on November 26, 1990; the posthumous 41st volume, which includes the final chapters that Miura had created for the series, was released in 2021. 43 have been released as of 2025. Dark Horse Comics has been releasing the English editions of the volumes since October 22, 2003, and began publishing hardcover editions containing multiple volumes on February 27, 2019. The Japanese volumes were re-released with new cover art starting in 2016, following the rebranding of Hakusensha's Jets Comics imprint as Young Animal Comics.

== Volumes ==
No.	Original release date	Original ISBN	English release date	English ISBN
1	November 26, 1990	978-4-592-13574-6	October 22, 2003	978-1-59307-020-5
"The Black Swordsman" (黒い剣士, Kuroi Kenshi; beginning of "The Black Swordsman Arc"); "The Brand" (烙印, Rakuin); "The Guardians of Desire (1)" (欲望の守護天使(1), Yokubō no Shugotenshi (1))
A lone swordsman named Guts walks into an inn where a group of bandits are tormenting an elf named Puck and a red-haired youth. Guts kills all but one of the bandits, telling him to inform his master that the Black Swordsman is coming. Guts later finds and kills the Baron before taking his leave, inspiring Puck to travel with the swordsman. Accepting a ride from an old priest named Adolf, Guts experiences a nightmare and wakes up to an attack by spiritually-possessed skeletons, which kill Adolf and his daughter Colette. Guts and Puck arrive at a town run by a pagan-hunting Count that Guts targets. After provoking the Count's guards, killing many and severely injuring their captain, Zondark, Guts finds himself cornered. He is then rescued by a cloaked, bandaged man named Vargas, who leads him to his hidden laboratory. Vargas reveals he was once a physician and begs Guts to kill the Count, then shows him a secret room containing only an egg-shaped object that bears human facial features scattered around its surface. Guts recognizes the object as a Behelit.
2	February 26, 1991	978-4-592-13575-3	January 14, 2004	978-1-59307-021-2
"The Guardians of Desire (2–3)" (欲望の守護天使(2〜3), Yokubō no Shugotenshi (2–3))
Vargas explains he once served the Count but fled after witnessing horrific acts, including the murder of his family. Vargas stole the Behelit, a mystical object later revealed by Guts to open a portal to the demonic God Hand. Meanwhile, the Count empowers the injured Zondark by implanting a slug-like creature in him, transforming him into a monstrous servant who battles Guts but is eventually crushed. Guts takes the Behelit from Vargas and leaves him, only for Vargas to be captured and executed publicly. Haunted by Vargas' death and the parallel between their struggles, Guts is reminded of his own losses and rededicates himself to killing the Count. The Count imprisons his daughter Theresia in a tower, claiming the world outside is too dangerous. Guts storms the castle, defeating Zondark again and fighting his way through guards to reach the throne room. Theresia and Puck bond, and she allows him to leave and reunite with Guts. Guts confronts the Count, who transforms into a powerful, regenerative slug-like monster. Despite being severely beaten, Guts remains determined to defeat the Count, even as the battle shakes the castle and Theresia finally leaves her room, drawn by the chaos.
3	October 25, 1991	978-4-592-13576-0	April 14, 2004	978-1-59307-022-9
"The Guardians of Desire (4–6)" (欲望の守護天使(4〜6), Yokubō no Shugotenshi (4–6)); "The Golden Age (1)" (黄金時代(1), Ōgon Jidai (1); beginning of the "Golden Age Arc")
As Theresia enters the throne room, Guts uses her as a shield to exploit the Count's hesitation, delivering a brutal counterattack that severs the Count's head. The Behelit activates due to Count's fear of death, transporting everyone to a surreal dimension where the God Hand appear, including the enigmatic Femto, whom Guts recognizes as his former comrade, Griffith. Guts attacks Femto but is repelled, and the God Hand offer the Count a chance to live in exchange for sacrificing Theresia, revealing he previously sacrificed her mother to gain his apostle powers. The Count ultimately fails to make the choice in time and is consumed by a swirling mass of souls. Back in the real world, Theresia, devastated by the events, contemplates, but does not commit suicide. Guts eventually leaves her behind, emotionally shaken and Puck notices his hidden grief. In a flashback, a mercenary band led by Gambino finds a newborn baby beneath a hanged corpse. Shisu, Gambino's lover, takes in the child, who is later revealed to be Guts, despite the group seeing him as a bad omen. After Shisu dies of the plague, Guts is forced into battle and harshly trained by Gambino, using adult-sized weapons and enduring physical abuse. At nine, Guts gets his first kill but is later betrayed when Gambino allows another mercenary to sexually assault him.
4	February 26, 1992	978-4-592-13577-7	July 14, 2004	978-1-59307-203-2
"The Golden Age (2–6)" (黄金時代(2〜6), Ōgon Jidai (2–6))
Raised by his adoptive father and mentor Gambino, the young Guts was forced to kill Gambino when the man attempted to murder him in misplaced blame for his wife's death and the loss of his leg. A few years later, an older Guts attracts the attention of a mercenary group, The Band of the Hawk, when he kills the knight Bazuso during a siege. Corkus attempts to rob Guts before he is saved by the Hawks' female captain Casca, who is in turn saved by their leader Griffith as he grievously wounds Guts. When Guts recovers days later, he is forced into joining the Band of the Hawk when Griffith defeats him in a duel.
5	March 29, 1993	978-4-592-13578-4	October 13, 2004	978-1-59307-251-3
"The Golden Age (7–8)" (黄金時代(7〜8), Ōgon Jidai (7–8)); 001. "A Wind of Swords" (剣風, Kenpū); 002–005. "Nosferatu Zodd (1–4)" (不死の(ノスフェラトゥ)ゾッド(1〜4), Nosuferatu Zoddo (1–4)); 006. "Master of the Sword (1)" (剣の主(1), Tsurugi no Aruji (1))
Guts learns that Griffith possesses a Behelit pendant. Three years pass and the Band of the Hawk grow in power and numbers as they are employed by the Kingdom of Midland for its Hundred Year War against the Tudor Empire. At the same time Griffith rises in the kingdom's hierarchy, while Guts is promoted to raid leader. During a siege, Guts and Griffith encounter the Apostle Nosferatu Zodd, a fearsome immortal warrior who nearly kills them before noticing Griffith's Behelit. Zodd takes his leave while warning Guts that Griffith will be his doom once the latter's dream crumbles while still considering him a friend.
6	September 29, 1993	978-4-592-13579-1	January 19, 2005	978-1-59307-252-0
007. "Master of the Sword (2)" (剣の主(2), Tsurugi no Aruji (2)); 008–011. "Assassin (1–4)" (暗殺者(1〜4), Ansatsusha (1–4)); 012. "Precious Thing" (貴きもの, Tōtokimono); 013. "Departure for the Front" (出陣, Shutsujin); 014. "Engagement" (合戦, Kassen); 015–016. "Casca (1–2)" (キャスカ(1〜2), Kyasuka (1–2))
Griffith's rise in status and growing closeness to Princess Charlotte is ill-received by Midland's noblemen, with the king's brother Julius orchestrating an assassination attempt during a fall hunt. But Griffith's Behelit prevents the poisoned arrow from touching his skin. Griffith tasks Guts with murdering Julius. Guts succeeds but is emotionally scarred when he kills the noble's son, Adonis, to conceal the deed. Guts hears Griffith tell Charlotte his ideals about what he considers a friend, and Guts realizes that Griffith does not consider him or the others as friends. When news of Julius's death is ruled to be the work of Tudor assassins, the Hawks return to battle following Griffith's encounter with Julius's co-conspirator Minister Foss. During the Hawks' battle against the Blue Whale Knights, Casca develops a fever caused by menstruation. When attacked by the Blue Whale's misogynist commander, Adon Coborlwitz, Casca and Guts fall off a cliff into a river. While they hide in a cave, Casca shares her story of how Griffith saved her from being raped by a noble.
7	March 29, 1994	978-4-592-13580-7	May 11, 2005	978-1-59307-328-2
017. "Casca (3)" (キャスカ(3), Kyasuka (3)); 018–020. "Prepared for Death (1–3)" (決死行(1〜3), Kesshikō (1–3)); 021. "Survival" (生還, Seikan); 022. "Campfire of Dreams" (夢のかがり火, Yume no Kagaribi); 023–026. "The Battle for Doldrey (1–4)" (ドルドレイ攻略戦(1〜4), Dorudorei Kōryakusen (1–4))
Casca continues her story and reveals that Griffith engaged in sexual transactions with the pederast lord Gennon to fund the Band of Hawk. When the two are found by Adon and his men, Guts defeats most of them while covering Casca's escape, eventually coming to a conclusion to leave the Hawks to find his own dream to become Griffith's true friend. Later, Griffith volunteers the Hawks to reclaim the impregnable Fortress of Doldrey from Tudor governor Gennon. The Hawks begin their assault in a scheme to take the fortress by luring out the bulk of the Tudor army so Casca can lead a group to infiltrate it.
8	September 29, 1994	978-4-592-13690-3	July 13, 2005	978-1-59307-329-9
027–028. "The Battle for Doldrey (5–6)" (ドルドレイ攻略戦(5〜6), Dorudorei Kōryakusen (5–6)); 029. "Triumphant Return" (凱旋, Gaisen); 030. "Moment of Glory" (栄光の瞬間, Eikō no toki); 031–032. "Tombstone of Flame (1–2)" (炎の墓標(1〜2), Honō no Bohyō (1–2)); 033. "One Snowy Night" (ある雪の夜に..., Aru Yuki no Yoru ni...); 034–036. "The Morning Departure (1–3)" (旅立ちの朝(1〜3), Tabidachi no Asa (1–3))
Casca manages to kill Adon while Guts decapitates the Purple Rhino Knights' commander Boscogn, turning the tide of the battle. The Hawks' reclaiming of Doldrey marks the end of the Hundred-Year War as they return to Wyndam with a ball held in their honor. The Queen, Charlotte's stepmother and Julius's secret lover, hatches a scheme with Foss to poison Griffith during the banquet, seemingly succeeding when he collapses after drinking poisoned wine. Believing that their plan was successful, the Queen and her conspirators celebrate in a tower, only to find themselves trapped as the building is set ablaze. Griffith reveals to have coerced Foss into faking his death to kill his remaining opposition with Guts executing the thugs he hired to hold Foss's daughter hostage for the minister's compliance. A month after the queen's funeral, Guts parts ways with Griffith after defeating him in a duel.
9	March 29, 1995	978-4-592-13691-0	October 12, 2005	978-1-59307-330-5
037. "Knight of Skeleton" (髑髏の騎士, Dokuro no kishi); 038. "Start of the Everlasting Night" (果てしなき夜の始まり, Hateshinaki Yoru no hajimari); 039. "The Fallen Hawk" (墜ちた鷹, Ochita taka); 040. "Demise of a Dream" (夢の終焉, Yume no Shūen); 041. "Arms Tournament" (闘技会, Tōgikai); 042. "The Fugitives" (逃亡者たち, Tōbōsha-tachi); 043. "The Fighter" (闘者, Tōsha); 044. "Comrades in Arms" (戦友, Sen'yū); 045. "Confession" (告白, Kokuhaku); 046–047. "Wounds (1–2)" (傷(1〜2), Kizu (1–2))
Guts encounters a mysterious skull-faced knight who warns him about an event called the Ecplise, set to occur in a year's time. The knight further explains that Guts and his friends are doomed. Meanwhile, Griffith, devastated by Guts' departure, makes a reckless decision in a moment of weakness and is caught sleeping with Charlotte. As a result, he is arrested for treason and imprisoned in the Tower of Rebirth, while the Band of the Hawk is declared an outlaw group. A year later, Guts learns of the Hawks' fugitive status and that Casca is their new captain, prompting him to reunite with them. Guts learns of Casca's plan to rescue Griffith from the Tower of Rebirth, he ends up being forced to fight her as she blames Guts for Griffith's troubles before realizing it was not his fault. After the two consummate their love, Guts asks Casca to leave with him after they save Griffith.
10	September 29, 1995	978-4-592-13692-7	January 25, 2006	978-1-59307-331-2
048. "Sparks from a Sword Tip" (切っ先の火花, Kissaki no Hibana); 049–050. "Infiltrating Windham (1–2)" (ウィンダム潜入(1〜2), Windamu Sennyū (1–2)); 051–052. "Festival's Eve (1–2)" (前夜祭(1〜2), Zen'yasai (1–2)); 053. "Thousand-Year Fiefdom" (千年封土, Sennen Hōdo); 054. "Reunion in the Abyss" (深淵の再会, Shin'en no Saikai); 055. "A Way Through" (血路, Ketsuro); 056–057. "Bakiraka (1–2)" (バーキラカ(1〜2), Bākiraka (1–2)); 058. "Flower of the Stone Castle" (石の王城の花, Ishi no Shiro no Hana)
Casca and Guts go into the dungeon under the Tower of Rebirth with Charlotte's help to rescue Griffith, finding him mute, crippled and horribly disfigured from a year of seemingly endless torture. They manage to get Griffith out of Wyndam while fighting through the Kushan assassins known as the Bakiraka, the king refuses to let Griffith escape and assigns his retrieval to his most depraved fighting force: The Black Dog Knights.
11	March 29, 1996	978-4-592-13693-4	April 12, 2006	978-1-59307-470-8
059–062. "Devil Dogs (1–4)" (魔犬(1〜4), Maken (1–4)); 063. "Roar of the Wild Beast" (狂獣咆哮, Kyōjū Hōkō); 064. "Forest of Tragedy" (惨劇の森, Sangeki no Mori); 065–066. "Mortal Combat (1–2)" (死闘(1〜2), Shitō (1–2)); 067. "Armour to the Heart" (甲冑は胸に, Yoroi wa Mune ni); 068. "The Flying One" (飛来者..., Hiraisha...); 069. "The Immortal Once Again" (不死者再び, Fushisha Futatabi)
Following their escape from Wyndham, the Band of the Hawk successfully fends off the Black Dog Knights. However, they are soon confronted by the knights' commander, Wyald, a sadistic and brutal warrior who reveals himself to be an Apostle. Despite suffering severe injuries in combat with Guts, Wyald attempts to undermine the Hawks' morale by exposing Griffith's physical ruin and asserting that he is no longer capable of leading them. As Wyald moves to kill Griffith, Zodd intervenes and executes Wyald, before taking his leave.
12	September 27, 1996	978-4-592-13694-1	July 12, 2006	978-1-59307-484-5
070. "Requiem of the Wind" (風の鎮魂歌(レクイエム), Kaze no Rekuiemu); 071. "The Warriors of Twilight" (黄昏の戦士達, Tasogare no Senshi-tachi); 072. "Back Alley Boy" (路地裏の少年, Rojiura no Shōnen); 073. "Eclipse" (蝕, Shoku); 074. "The Promised Time" (約束の刻, Yakusoku no Toki); 075. "Advent" (降臨, Kōrin); 076. "The Inhuman Host" (人外百鬼, Ningai Hyakki); 077. "The Castle" (城, Shiro); 078. "Parting" (決別, Ketsubetsu); 079. "The Feast" (宴, Utage)
The forlorn Hawks proceeding to rendezvous with the rest of the group at Midland border while unaware that all but Rickert were slaughtered by Apostles. Casca feels she must take care of Griffith, and tells Guts to leave. Delirious and horrified at what he has been reduced to, Griffith takes off in a wagon and crashes into a shallow lake in a suicide attempt. He finds his Behelit and unintentionally activates it when the Hawks find him as a solar eclipse occurs, taking everyone present to a convergence of the physical and Astral planes. The four Guardian Angels of the God Hand appear and inform Griffith that his tribulations have led to him being chosen as their final member. To everyone's shock and despair, this requires him to offer up the Band of the Hawk as a blood sacrifice. One of the God Hand members shows Griffith visions of his consciousness to convince him that a few more sacrificed lives are trivial in regard to the fulfillment of his dream. Before Guts can reach him, Griffith accepts the offer. Consequently, the Hawks are branded by another God Hand member, while the Apostles commence a ritual killing to begin Griffith's transition into a demon.
13	March 27, 1997	978-4-592-13695-8	September 27, 2006	978-1-59307-500-2
080–081. "Storm of Death (1–2)" (死の嵐(1〜2), Shi no Arashi (1–2)); 082. "God of the Abyss" (深淵の神, Shin'en no Kami); 084. "Lifeblood" (鮮血, Senketsu); 085. "Quickening" (胎動, Taidō); 086. "Birth" (誕生, Tanjō); 087. "Afterglow of the Right Eye" (右目の残照, Migime no Zanshō); 088. "Escape" (脱出, Dasshutsu); 089. "Awakening to a Nightmare" (悪夢にめざめて, Akumu ni Mezamete); 090. "The Sprint" (疾走, Shissō); 091. "Vow of Retaliation" (反撃の誓い, Hangeki no Chikai)
As Rickert bears witness to the Skull Knight and Zodd battling outside the storm entrance to the Interstice, the Band of the Hawk are decimated by the Apostles with only Guts and Casca left alive. Griffith, feeling his comrades' deaths while gaining an understanding of the world and his rule as mankind's judge, is reborn in Void form, christened Femto. Griffith rapes Casca in front of Guts as the latter loses his left arm and right eye in an attempt to save her, the two sprited back to their plane by the Skull Knight. A few days later, Guts learns that Casca lost her sanity from the nightmarish ordeal and that their Brands of Sacrifice will subject them to nightly attacks by various evil creatures. Guts fends off the specters attacking him while motivated by his rage to declare his intent to hunt down Griffith and kill him.
14	September 29, 1997	978-4-592-13696-5	December 6, 2006	978-1-59307-501-9
092. "Demon Infant" (幼魔, Yōma); 093. "Armament" (武装, Busō); 094. "He Who Hunts Dragons" (ドラゴンを狩る者, Doragon o Karumono); 095. "The Black Swordsman, Once More" (黒い剣士、再び, Kuroi Kenshi, Futatabi; beginning of the "Conviction Arc"); 096. "The Elves of Misty Valley" (霧の谷の妖精, Kiri no Tani no Yōsei); 097. "Jill" (ジル, Jiru); 098. "By Air" (飛来, Hirai); 099. "Elf Bugs" (妖虫, Yōchū); Bonus: Berserk: The Prototype
Their unborn child mutated by Griffith's rape into the Demon Child that would follow him, Guts leaves Casca under the care of Godo and Rickert as he embarks on a journey to hunt down Apostles and the God Hand after acquiring the Dragonslayer Sword and his prosthetic arm. Two years, following the battle with the Count, Guts and Puck find themselves facing Apostle spawn in the form of elves.
15	January 29, 1998	978-4-592-13697-2	January 31, 2007	978-1-59307-577-4
100. "Queen" (クイーン(女王), Kuīn); 101. "Elf Fire" (鬼火, Onibi); 102. "Red-Eyed Peekaf" (赤い目のピーカフ, Akai me no Pīkafu); 103. "The Recollected Girl" (追憶の少女, Tsuioku no Shōjo); 104. "The World of Winged Things" (羽あるものの世界, Hanearumono no Sekai); 105–106. "Guardians (1–2)" (守護者(ガーディアン)(1〜2), Gādian (1–2)); 107. "Pursuers" (追跡者, Tsuisekisha); 108–109. "The Misty Valley (1–2)" (霧の谷(1〜2), Kiri no Tani (1–2)); 110. "Cocoons" (繭, Mayu)
Guts rescues a child named Jill from bandits. After a chilly reception in Jill's home village, Guts and Puck discover that her childhood friend Rosine is an Apostle. Rosine has transformed herself and lost children from the village into elf-like monsters, who prey on adult villagers but live joyful and carefree lives amongst themselves. Jill considers joining Rosine's society, until she discovers that the lost children "play war" and kill each other.
16	August 26, 1998	978-4-592-13698-9	March 28, 2007	978-1-59307-706-8
111. "Monster" (怪物, Kaibutsu); 112. "Sky Demon" (空魔, Kūma); 113. "A Bloody Night Sky" (鮮血の夜空, Senketsu no Yozora); 114. "The Space Between Demon and Man" (魔と人の狭間, Ma to Hito no Hazama); 115. "Firefly" (蛍, Hotaru); 116. "The Way Home" (家路, Ieji); 117. "Blue Sky Elf" (青空の妖精, Sora no Yōsei); 118. "The Beast of Darkness" (闇の獣, "Yami no Kedamono"); 119–120. "The Holy Iron Chain Knights (1–2)" (聖鉄鎖騎士団(1〜2), Seitessa Kishi-dan (1–2)); 121. "The Hollow Idol" (空洞の偶像, Kūdō no Gūzō)
Exhausted from his battle with Rosine and haunted by his inner demons, Guts is surrounded by the Holy Iron Chain Knights. These knights of the Holy See have been tracking Guts since investigating the aftermath of the Eclipse. After his capture, Guts is interrogated by the commander of the Holy Iron Chain Knights, Farnese, about the demise of the Band of the Hawk. Guts mocks Farnese's authority and faith, provoking her to whip him. Azan stops her and locks Guts in a cage.
17	March 29, 1999	978-4-592-13699-6	May 30, 2007	978-1-59307-742-6
122. "The Unseen" (見ざる者, Mizarumono); 123. "Night of Miracles" (奇跡の夜, Kiseki no Yoru); 124. "Past and Future" (去来, Kyorai); 125. "Morning of Truth" (真実の朝, Shinjitsu no Asa); 126–128. "Revelations (1–3)" (啓示(1〜3), Keiji (1–3)); 129. "Cracks in the Blade" (刃の亀裂, Yaiba no Kiretsu); 130. "A Feeble Flame" (かよわき炎, Kayowaki Honō); 131–132. "To Holy Ground (1–2)" (聖地へ(1〜2), Seichi e (1–2))
Puck frees Guts at nightfall, and he takes Farnese hostage to escape. Only the knights' herald, Serpico, gives chase before finding himself surrounded by spirits. The spirits pass Serpico and possess hounds that Guts fights off before killing a possessed horse, with it about to rape a horrified Farnese. A spirit then possesses Farnese and forces her to act out her lust by straddling Guts until sunrise. Serpico retrieves a traumatized Farnese and escorts her back to their camp, allowing Guts a reprieve despite Farnese's demand to have him killed. At Windham, the King of Midland dies having seen a vision about Griffith's return while the Kushan army appears on the horizon. Guts awakens from a nightmare of Casca being burned at the stake as a witch, seeing the Demon Child as it warns him that its mother is in danger. Guts returns to Godo's home, with Erika and Rickert confessing that Casca has escaped from the cave where she was confined. The bedridden Godo tells Guts that he made a grave mistake by abandoning Casca while he tried to drown his sorrow with revenge. After Godo uses the last of his strength to repair his sword, Guts departs to St. Albion to find Casca. Meanwhile, Farnese and her knights see the flood of refugees from Midland's disasters to St. Albion while escorting the inquisitor Bishop Mozgus to the city. While Mozgus punishes accused heretics who attempted to kill him, the prostitute Luca finds Casca wandering alone.
18	October 1, 1999	978-4-592-13716-0	July 25, 2007	978-1-59307-743-3
133–134. "Kushan Scouts (1–2)" (クシャーン斥候(1〜2), Kushān Sekkō (1–2)); 135–136. "Tower of Shadow (1–2)" (影の塔(1〜2), Kage no Tō (1–2)); 137. "Children of Shadow" (影の子ら, Kage no Kora); 138. "Fierce Believer" (猛信者, Mōshinja); 139. "Bowels of the Holy Ground" (聖地のはらわた, Seichi no Harawata); 140. "The Witch" (魔女, Majo); 141–142. "Spirit Road (1–2)" (怪道(1〜2), Kaidō (1–2)); 143. "Pillar of Flame" (炎の柱, Honō no Hashira)
Guts kills some Kushan scouts while passing through to St. Albion, followed by a red-haired youth named Isidro who admires him. In Albion, with the surrounding refugee camp in utter disarray from the starved and over-populated masses, Mozgus begins his task in the Tower of Conviction where "sinful" beggars are tortured. Meanwhile, Luca divides earnings from her client Jerome among her fellows. Calling Casca "Elaine" while presenting her as her bandaged and diseased sister for her well being, Luca entrusts the girl to her fellow Nina, who is treating her own disease, while she fetches water. At nightfall, as the Demon Child saves Casca from spiritually-animated corpses near the bank that Nina is fetching water from, Guts encounters the Skull Knight who reveals the God Hand are using St. Albion as the site of a ritual to restore Griffith's corporeal form. The next day, as Farnese finds herself struggling with her faith, Nina meets her reoccurring customer Joachim and tests his love for her by bringing him to a midnight orgy held by the pagan cult's goat-headed leader. Joachim gradually engages until learning that the pagans are cannibals and tries to flee, falling off a cliff. Nina breaks down before seeing Luca, who disciplines her before forgiving her, and then learns that Casca followed her. Casca nearly gets raped by the pagans but is saved by spirits attracted by her brand before the Demon Child disperses them, the surviving pagans assuming Casca to be a witch.
19	March 29, 2000	978-4-592-13717-7	September 26, 2007	978-1-59307-744-0
144. "The Black Swordsman on Holy Ground" (聖地の黒い剣士, Seichi no Kuroi Kenshi); 145. "Straying" (迷走, Meisō); 146. "Ambition Boy" (野望少年, Yabō Shōnen); 147. "Den of Evil" (魔窟, Makutsu); 148. "The Reunion" (再会, Saikai); 149. "Ambush" (伏兵, Fukuhei); 150. "The Cliff" (断崖, Dangai); 151. "Captives" (虜囚, Ryoshū); 152. "The Iron Maiden" (鉄の処女, Tetsu no Shojo); 153–154. "Blood Flow of the Dead (1–2)" (亡者の血流(1〜2), Mōja no Ketsuryū (1–2))
Guts arrives to St. Albion and dispatches Holy Knights harassing Luca and her apprentice Pepe. Luca takes Guts to her tent upon recognizing his brand, only to find that a fearful Nina abducted Casca. The group divides to search; Isidro and Puck find Nina and Casca when they are captured by the pagan cult. In their cave, the pagans intend to marry Casca to the Great Goat with Nina as a sacrificial offering, but Isidro distracts the pagans while Puck goes after Guts. When Farnese and her knights, led by Joachim, arrive, Casca's brand awakens the dead which possess some pagans to indiscriminately attack people. Isidro attempts to save Casca, while the Great Goat is transformed into a monster by a mysterious observer. When the Great Goat attempts to consummate his marriage, Guts arrives to cover Casca's escape with Isidro and Nina before following them after killing the Great Goat. But Guts is confronted by Serpico, who uses the terrain and Guts's current state to his advantage. Guts finally manages to drive Serpico off upon disarming him, only to learn Casca and Nina are captured and taken Tower of Conviction. The mysterious observer witnesses Guts, Isidro and Luca make their way into the tower while the spirits within are stirred by two Brands of Sacrifice in close proximity, manifesting as a flesh-eating blob of blood.
20	October 27, 2000	978-4-592-13718-4	November 28, 2007	978-1-59307-745-7
155. "The Spider's Thread" (蜘蛛の糸, Kumo no Ito); 156. "Those Who Dance at the Summit, Those Who Creep in the Depths" (頂に舞うもの底に這うもの, Itadaki ni Maumono Soko ni Haumono); 157. "Hell's Angels" (ヘルス・エンジェルス, Herusu Enjerusu); 158. "One Unknown in the Depths of Depths" (底の底の知られぬ者, Soko no Soko no Shirarenu mono); 159. "The Threatened" (脅えし者, Obieshimono); 160. "Omens" (兆し, Kizashi); 161. "Martyrdom" (殉教, Junkyō); 162. "Collapse" (崩壊, Hōkai); 163–165. "Shadows of Idea (1–3)" (イデアの影(1〜3), Idea no Kage (1–3))
While Luca and Isidro use Jerome to free Nina, Guts forces Farnese to take him to the torture chamber where Puck tells that Casca is trapped within the blood as it is pursuing Mozgus and his men before they are transformed by the observer. Mozgus burns away some of the blood with his flames, freeing Casca and saving Luca's group, but he intends to have the former burned at the stake while his men attack the latter. Luca sacrificed herself so Jerome can save Nina, only to be saved by the Skull Knight then spirited off by the observer: a Behelit-like Apostle self-dubbed the Egg of the Perfect World. The Egg tells Luca his story of long observation of everyone in St. Albion, detailing his ideals and the event to soon occur. After the Egg flees the Skull Knight with only a mortal wound inflicted on him, the Skull Knight takes Luca to safety as the living mounds of starved corpses rise up. Back in the Tower of Conviction, Guts arrives faces Mozgus' winged subordinate as he and the Twins fly off with Casca. Though Guts manages to kill Mozgus's disciples, the possessed blood causes the tower to partially collapse. The chaos unfolds in the slums, but Mozgus uses his powers to keep the corpses at bay while the refugees proceed to build a pyre to burn Casca on. Guts sees this while noticing the four God Hand members manifesting through the blood. As Luca walks back to St. Albion after the Skull Knight took her to the outskirts, the Egg of the Perfect World swallows the dying Demon Child out of sympathy during his climb up the Tower of Conviction.
21	May 29, 2001	978-4-592-13719-1	January 23, 2008	978-1-59307-746-4
166. "Leaping Fish" (跳魚, Hane Uo); 167–168. "Bestial Priest (1–2)" (怪僧(1〜2), Kaisō (1–2)); 169. "Those Who Cling, Those Who Struggle" (縋る者もがく者, Sugarumono Mogakumono); 170–171. "Tidal Wave of Darkness (1–2)" (闇の津波(1〜2), Yami no Tsunami (1–2)); 172. "Resonance" (共鳴, Kyōmei); 173. "The Sky Fall" (天墜つ, Ten Otsu); 174. "Daybreak" (暁, Akatsuki); 175. "The Arrival" (出現, Shutsugen); 176. "Determination and Departure" (決意と旅立ち, Ketsui to Tabidachi)
Enlisting Jerome and Nina's help, Isidro uses a makeshift pulley system to free Casca as she was about to be burned alive. Mozgus nearly catches them when Guts leaps off the tower and impales the inquisitor. But Mozgus's bible shielded him from the attack while he fully transforms. After Isidro's group eliminate the last of Mozgus's disciples, the inquisitor overpowering him while the flames keeping the corpses at bay die out, Guts uses his miniature bombs to blow apart the unprotected chink in the inquistitor's armored body to kill him. After a brief reunion with Casca, the corpses manage to flood into St. Albion as Guts gives his group torches so they can outlast the few remaining hours of night. While Luca saves Nina down below the tower, the Egg of the Perfect World calls the dead to the Tower of Conviction and sacrifices himself to complete the ritual with the Demon Child becoming Griffith's corporeal vessel. The Tower collapses once the ritual ran its course, killing everyone inside it before daybreak as Guts and the others find themselves surrounded by Silat and his Kushans before Zodd drives the Kushans. Guts then sees a newly reconstituted Griffith, yet could not attack him due to Casca while the others use the Apostle's appearance to flee as a Kushan legion arrives. Zodd spirits Griffith away on his back while Guts steals a horse to take Casca back to Godo's home. Isidro departs on his own while Luca pays her respects the Egg and those who died that night. While Nina reunites with Joachim, Farnese renounces her faith and decides to follow Guts with Serpico remaining by her side. Back at Albion's ruins, the Skull Knight muses that the events which occurred will soon change the world.
22	December 19, 2001	978-4-592-13720-7	March 26, 2008	978-1-59307-863-8
177. "The Rent World" (ほころぶ世界, Hokorobu Sekai; beginning of the "Falcon of the Millennium Empire Arc"); 178. "Reunion on the Hill of Swords" (剣の丘の再会, Ken no Oka no Saikai); 179. "The Beast Swordsman VS The Black Swordsman" (獣剣士対黒い剣士, Kedamono Kenshi Tai Kuroi Kenshi); 180. "Unchanged" (不変, Fuhen); 181. "Prologue to the War" (戦記の序章, Senki no Joshō); 182. "Fierce Kushan Attack" (クシャーン猛襲, Kushān Mōshū); 183–184. "War Cry of the Wind (1–2)" (鬨の風(1〜2), Toki no Kaze (1–2)); 185. "Of Snow and Flames/First Act" (雪と炎と/前篇, Yuki to Honō to/Zenpen); 186. "Of Snow and Flames/Final Act" (雪と炎と/後篇, Yuki to Honō to/Kōhen)
Guts and Casca return to Godo's home. They find that he died during their absence. Erika and Rickert urge them to take refuge in an elf-blessed cave nearby. By staying in the cave, they could stay safe in the long term without attracting monsters with their sacrifices. Then, the resurrected Griffith appears. Guts attacks Griffith, but Nosferatu Zodd blocks him. Their ensuing duel destroys the cave. Guts decides to take Casca and leave to avoid endangering Erika and Rickert. Puck suggests that Guts and Casca go to his homeland as a potential refuge. Meanwhile, Griffith arrives at a castle in Midland occupied by the invading Kushan army. Griffith and his loyal supernatural warriors cut down the Kushan forces. The Midlander survivors hail Griffith as a guardian angel.
23	June 28, 2002	978-4-592-13721-4	May 28, 2008	978-1-59307-864-5
187–188. "Winter Journey (1–2)" (冬の旅路(1〜2), Fuyu no Tabiji (1–2)); 189. "Scattered Time" (こぼれた時間, Koboreta Jikan); 190. "Fangs of Ego" (我牙, Gaki); 191. "Wilderness Reunion" (荒れ野の再会, Areno no Saikai); 192. "The War Demons" (戦魔, Senma); 193. "Banner of the Flying Sword" (飛剣の御旗, Hiken no Ohata); 194. "Wings of Light and Darkness" (光と闇の翼, Hikari to Yami no Tsubasa); 195. "The Night of Falling Stars" (星降る夜, Hoshi Furu Yoru); 196. "Like a Baby" (嬰児の如く, Midorigo no Gotoku)
Guts struggles to protect Casca. She wanders off and is attacked by bandits. She steals one of their swords and kills them all. Guts holds her down and chokes her out of lust and frustration before stopping himself. She no longer trusts him, so he ties her hands and drags her along. Their downward spiral is interrupted when Isidro, Serpico, and Farnese arrive and ask to join their journey. By sharing their efforts, their struggles ease. Meanwhile, Griffith continues to push the Kushan army back. He has declared his forces the new Band of the Hawk. Midlander refugees, Kushan defectors, famous heroes from distant lands, giants, and demons all rally to his forces. With the help of a medium named Sonia, Griffith enables the spirits of deceased soldiers to exchange final words with their loved ones, inspiring intense loyalty among his camp followers.
24	December 19, 2002	978-4-592-13722-1	July 23, 2008	978-1-59307-865-2
197. "Trolls" (獣鬼(トロール), Torōru); 198. "The Witch" (魔女, Majo); 199–200. "Mansion of the Spirit Tree (1–2)" (霊樹の館(1〜2), Reiju no Kan (1–2)); 201. "The Astral World" (幽界, Kakuriyo); 202. "Magic Stone" (魔石, Maseki); 203. "Elementals" (元素霊, Erementaru); 204. "Enoch Village" (イーノック村, Īnokku Mura); 205. "Ambition and Reflection" (野望と追憶, Yabō to Tsuioku); 206. "Troll Raid" (獣鬼(トロール)襲来, Torōru Shūrai)
Isidro's sword skills progress, under Guts's tutelage. Emboldened, Isidro fights a troll to protect Casca and Farnese. When more trolls arrive, a witch intervenes to protect the group. The witch, Schierke, introduces the group to her teacher Flora, who had anticipated their arrival. The witches teach the group about the nature of the world: magic creatures reside in a many-layered Astral World that partly overlaps with the Physical World. They then and use their magic to suppress the evil spirits attracted to Guts and Casca, and arm the group with magic weapons to use against the trolls. However, the villagers are skeptical about the group's ability to protect them. The village priest is certain Schierke is a fraud. Schierke, in turn, blames the Holy See for keeping people ignorant of useful knowledge and driving Flora to live alone in the woods. Finally, the trolls attack the village, intending to eat everyone and everything. Serpico struggles to make his magic weapon function as they advance.
25	June 27, 2003	978-4-592-13723-8	September 24, 2008	978-1-59307-921-5
207. "Magic Sword" (魔法の剣, Mahō no Ken); 208. "Mirror of Sin" (罪の鏡, Tsumi no Kagami); 209. "Magic" (魔術(マジック), Majikku); 210. "The Arcana of Invocation" (祈りの奥義, Inori no Ōgi); 211–212. "Evil Horde (1–2)" (魔群(1〜2), Magun (1–2)); 213. "Raging Torrent" (激流, Gekiryū); 214. "Shaman" (シャーマン, Shāman); 215. "Qliphoth" (闇, Kurifoto); 216. "Taint" (汚濁, Odaku)
The group defends the villagers from trolls. Serpico respects the spirits that power his magical sword and cuts down hordes. Isidro does not respect the spirits and sees less success. The village priest tries to stop Schierke from casting a protection spell. She succeeds anyway, and the priest is shaken when she tells him that the four guardian spirits she invoked are the same as the four angels in his holy book. Schierke's barrier keeps out the trolls. Two greater monsters arrive: an ogre and a kelpie. Guts and Serpico fend them off long enough for Schierke to cast a spell. She connects with water spirits that were once venerated at an old shrine over which the church was built, and she summons a flood to wash the monsters away. However, Schierke is unable to leave her spellcasting trance. Her elf familiar, Ivalera, tells Farnese how to bring Schierke's attention back to the physical world. Before she fully awakens, though, Casca and Farnese are swept away in the floodwaters. Schierke tracks them to a layer of the Astral World formed from humans' dark thoughts. There, Casca and Farnese watch as trolls and other monsters assault kidnapped villagers. One villager pleads for help until monsters hatch from inside her and rip her apart.
26	December 19, 2003	978-4-592-13724-5	November 26, 2008	978-1-59307-922-2
217. "Retribution" (報い(むくい), Mukui); 218. "Redemption" (報い(すくい), Sukui); 219. "Vicinity of the Netherworld" (黄泉のほとり, Yomi no Hotori); 220. "Whore Princess of the Uterine Sea" (胎海の娼姫, Harawada no Shōki); 221. "Companions" (道連, Nakama); 222. "Claw Marks" (爪痕, Tsumeato); 223–224. "The Blaze (1–2)" (炎上(1〜2), Enjō (1–2)); 225–226. "The Berserker Armor (1–2)" (狂戦士の甲冑(1〜2), Kyō Senshi no Katchū (1–2))
Farnese fends off the trolls to protect Casca. The group arrives in time to save them and the other kidnapped villagers. Meanwhile, Guts covers their escape. Schierke begins casting a spell to seal the trolls' lair entrance, expecting Guts to flee before it is complete. However, Guts is waylaid when the corpses' viscera join together to form an avatar of Slan, one of the God Hand. The Skull Knight arrives to rescue Guts, assuming that the God Hand has been summoned. Slan informs him that she came of her own volition and that, since Griffith's ascension, the physical and astral worlds have become increasingly intertwined. Schierke's spell destroys the nearby trolls but seals Guts and the Skull Knight inside. The Skull Knight vomits up a sword that he forged by swallowing Behelits. Using the Sword of Actuation, the Skull Knight cuts a rift through the layers of the Astral World, allowing Guts to escape and rejoin his companions. The group returns to Flora's mansion. They find it in flames, beset by Griffith's war demons. On her deathbed, Flora commands Schierke to give Guts a dangerous artifact: the Berserker Armor. The armor enables Guts to surpass human limits by allowing him to ignore pain, though it exacerbates his already severe injuries.
27	July 29, 2004	978-4-592-13725-2	January 28, 2009	978-1-59307-923-9
227. "Fire Dragon" (火竜, Hiryū); 228. "The Depths of Hellfire" (業火の底, Gōka no Soko); 229. "Departure of Flame" (炎の旅立ち, Honō no Tabidachi); 230. "Demon City" (魔都, Mato); 231. "Dread Emperor" (恐帝, Kyōtei); 232. "The Daka" (鬼兵(ダーカ), ("Dāka")); 233. "Demon Knights" (魔騎士, Makishi); 234. "Demon God" (魔神, Majin); 235. "The Sleeping Princess Awakens" (眠り姫の目覚め, Nemuri-hime no Mezame); 236. "The Sound of the Sea" (潮騒, Shiosai)
Guts continues to fight as the Berserker Armor melds with his body, holding his broken bones together. He is prepared to fight to the death until Schierke enters his mind and reminds him to protect Casca. Flora's lingering spirit covers the group's escape. Guts and his companions reach the coast. After a month of rest, Guts is still physically wounded but more psychologically healed than he has been since the Eclipse. Farnese convinces Schierke to teach her magic. Meanwhile, Windham, the capital of Midland, has fallen to the Kushan invasion. Ganishka, the Kushan emperor, is an Apostle himself. However, he defies their god and intends to overthrow him. Ganishka sacrifices most of Windham's population to gain sorcerous power and counter Griffith's inhuman forces. However, the new Band of the Hawk distracts Ganishka long enough for Griffith to rescue Princess Charlotte. This thwarts Ganishka's plan to marry Charlotte and claim Midland's throne.
28	February 28, 2005	978-4-592-13726-9	March 25, 2009	978-1-59582-209-3
237. "Proclaimed Omens" (告げられし兆し, Tsugerareshi Kizashi); 238. "The Boy in the Moonlight" (月下の少年, Gekka no Shōnen); 239. "Familiars" (使い魔, Tsukaima); 240. "Supernatural Fog" (怪霧, Kaikiri); 241. "Sea Beast (Makara)" (海獣(マカラ), Kaijū (Makara)); 242. "The Roar of the Sea" (海鳴り, Uminari); 243. "Superhuman (Jnanin)" (超者(ジャンアーニン), Chōja (Jan'ānin)); 244. "Navy Yard" (鎮守府, Chinjūfu); 245. "City of Humans" (人間の都市, Hito no Machi); 246. "The Kite and the Owl of the Wharf" (桟橋のトンビとフクロウ, Sanbashi no Tonbi to Fukurō)
After encountering the Skull Knight, who tells them that Casca may regain her senses, the group finds a child playing in the ocean. Casca forms a bond with the child, and the group takes refuge in a seaside hut. Crocodile soldiers from Kushan then attack, and the group fights to repel them. Following the flow of Od, Schierke locates the spell caster animating the crocodile soldiers. But, amidst the fog, a fearsome Makara stirs. Confronted with such a formidable opponent, Guts has no choice but to surrender to the power of the Berserk Armour. Only Schierke's magic is powerful enough to bring him back to reality. Meanwhile, great armies are assembling in Vritannis. Schierke stands out among the hordes of commoners and soldiers in the city. After quarreling with Isidro, she leaves the group and discovers a pathway lined with the corpses of Kushan slaves. The inhumanity of the scene compels her to cremate the bodies. At the docks, she is approached by a young woman who admires her for being a witch. The girl refers to herself as a 'kite' saved by the White Hawk, and the two bond over their mutual loneliness.
29	September 29, 2005	978-4-592-13727-6	May 27, 2009	978-1-59582-210-9
247. "Bloodshed" (刃傷, Ninjō); 248. "Warrior" (武者, Musha); 249. "A Meager Supper" (ささやかな晩餐, Sasayaka na Bansan); 250. "Homing" (帰巣, Kisō); 251. "Vandimion" (ヴァンディミオン, Vandimion); 252. "In the Garden" (庭園にて, Teien nite); 253. "The White Lily of the Field" (野の白百合, No no Shirayuri); 254. "Mother" (母, Haha); 255. "The Ball" (舞踏会, Butōkai); 256. "The Colonnade Chamber" (列柱の間, Rechū no Aida)
A group of Kushan children fleeing slave traders along the docks catch Schierke and Sonia's attention. When confronted, the traders reveal the kids are orphans whose parents were executed. Isidro arrives and skirmishes with the pirates alongside Sonia's watchdog, the "duck" knight. They duel the pirate captain and inadvertently rouse a sleeping knight who single-handedly repels the pirate gang. Outside the castle gate, Sonia asks Schierke to join them at the Band of the Hawk, but she turns the offer down. The troupe gathers at a canteen that evening where they fend off drunkards and Schierke dons commoner's clothes. Meanwhile, Princess Charlotte assimilates into the Band of the Hawk. She gifts Griffith and Sonia sweets, and Sonia finds company at the fireside of the lone archer. Back in Vritannis, Farnese practices magical projection while the group fails to secure passage to Elfhelm. Wanting to be useful, she visits her family's estate to solicit her father's aid, only to be rebuked. While there, Farnese reconnects with her brother, Manifico, who offers her a ship in exchange for her engagement to the nobleman Roderick of Schtauffen. Serpico delivers the news. Ruminating on her decision to abandon the group, Farnese encounters her mother who commends her daughter's effusive spirit and ability to find her place in the world. That evening, Farnese attends a ball where her brother and Roderick scheme of conquering the open ocean. Guts and the troupe try to infiltrate the party but are barred from entering by Serpico.
30	March 29, 2006	978-4-592-13728-3	July 29, 2009	978-1-59582-211-6
257. "Duel" (決闘(DUEL), Kettō (DUEL)); 258. "Suzerain of the Religious Domain" (教圏の宗主, Kyōken no Sōsha); 259. "Enchanted Tiger" (妖虎, Yōko); 260. "Intrusion" (乱入, Rannyū); 261. "The Rusted Birdcage" (錆びた鳥籠, Sabita Torikago); 262. "A Proclamation of War" (宣戦布告, Sensen Fukoku); 263. "Demon Beast Invasion" (妖獣侵攻, Yōjū Shinkō); 264. "Divine Revelation" (天啓, Tenkei); 265–266. "City of Demon Beasts (1–2)" (妖獣都市(1〜2), Yōjū Toshi (1–2))
Guts duels with Serpico, using crumbling pillars to defeat him. At the ball, just before Roderick's engagement to Farnese is to be announced by Manifico, she disappears to find Serpico. A tiger pishacha attacks and Farnese wields a silver candelabrum to defend against the attacker before being saved by Serpico. The tiger and its hoard are killed by Guts. The head of the Vandimion family refutes the use of magic during the skirmish as mere illusions to quell the suspicions of the bystanders. The harbor, ablaze in fire, distracts the nobles and attention is diverted to the Kushan monsters roaming the streets. Roderick offers to convey the group to Elfhelm on his personal warship, and Guts is confronted by Sir Owen who recognizes him as captain of the Hawks's raiders. Meanwhile, Sonia and Mule Wolflame, the "duck" knight, visit the Pontiff and convince him to meet Griffith. As the group makes for the ship, they are overwhelmed by hoards of Kushan forces.
31	September 29, 2006	978-4-592-14431-1	September 30, 2009	978-1-59582-366-3
267. "Scorching Bay" (灼熱湾, Shakunetsu Wan); 268. "Blaze Rod" (火炎輪(ブレイズ・ロッド), Kaenrin (Bureizu Roddo)); 269. "Sword Beast" (剣獣, Kenjū); 270. "Paramarishia Senani" (仙将(パラマリシヤ・センアーンイー), Senshō (Paramarishia Sen'ān'ī)); 271. "Eastern Magic" (東方魔術, Tōhō Majutsu); 272. "The Coiler" (塒巻く者, Toguro Makumono); 273. "Bursting Flame" (爆炎, Bakuen); 274. "Thunder Emperor" (雷帝, Raitei); 275. "Attack of the Demon Army" (魔軍襲来, Magun Shūrai); 276. "Cloud Cluster" (叢雲, Murakumo)
Guts and his companions are trapped in the port city of Vritannis, which is being overrun by Kushan's Daka forces. Fighting their way through the Daka, they make their way to the port. Guts leads the charge, battling the Daka in front, while Serpico and Isidro hold off the attackers from behind. Guts fights with ferocious intensity. Guts uses Berserker Armor while Schierke casts a spell, summoning an Astral being, the Wheel of Flame, to destroy the Daka forces. As they press forward, a hoard of Makara emerges, but are killed by Guts using the Berserker Armor. A Kushan Galleass arrives carrying a lone sorcerer, the Pishaca Gana leader. Guts attacks but is deflected by a water spout and Schierke, also trapped in the Berserk Armor, brings him back to his senses. Dodging multiple water spouts, Guts protects his allies from a falling ship mast. Serpico joins the fray and together they battle the Kundalini. Schierke summons the wheel of fire for the second time and destroys the giant water serpent. Out of the smoke and fog, Emperor Ganishka emerges in his gigantic apostle form and attacks with lightning. Impressed by Guts's fortitude, Ganishka proposes that Guts joins his fight to oppose the Godhand. Meanwhile, Griffith's apostles, led by Nosferatu Zodd, descend upon the city and swarm the Emperor.
32	November 29, 2007	978-4-592-14432-8	November 25, 2009	978-1-59582-367-0
277. "Human Bullet" (肉弾, Nikudan); 278. "Setting Sail" (船出, Funade); 279–280. "Massive Invasion (1–2)" (大侵攻(1〜2), Daishinkō (1–2)); 281. "The Flight" (飛来, Hirai); 282. "The Torn Battlefield" (裂ける戦場, Sakeru Senjō); 283. "Wind Coil" (風巻, Shimaki); 284. "The Midland Regular Army" (ミッドランド正規軍, Middorando Seikigun); 285. "Hero" (英雄, Eiyū); 286. "On Board" (船上にて, Senjō Nite)
During a flashback, Sonia tells Zodd he has a choice to fight the sword that once cut him or make it a weapon. In the heat of battle, he crashes into the sea with Guts and the two unite to destroy Ganishka's ethereal body. Kushan's Daka flee the city. The group, carrying an unconscious Guts, makes for Roderick's warship. Outside the Vritannis city gates, the armies of the Holy See Alliance are confronted by an overwhelming mass of Kushan forces. A small contingency from the Band of the Hawk cut through the Kushan battle line and encircle the Emperor's palace. Griffith approaches the Emperor who, fearing his power, assumes his apostle form. He attacks but cannot reach Griffith and is scattered by the wind. Begrudgingly, he forces the Kushan to retreat. The nobleman in Vritannis ride out to meet Griffith and contest the legitimacy of his so-called liberation army. Skeptical of his intentions, they question his authority until Princess Charlotte and His Holiness the Pontiff proclaim Griffith as the savior of Midland. Out at sea, Isidro spars with the Azan, the Moustache Knight, while Farnese and Schierke journey to the astral world.
33	October 24, 2008	978-4-592-14433-5	January 27, 2010	978-1-59582-372-4
287. "Bubbles of Futility" (水泡, Suibō); 288–289. "Naval Battle (1–2)" (海戦(1〜2), Kaisen (1–2)); 290. "A Howl from the Darkness" (闇からの咆哮, Yami kara no Hōkō); 291. "Dream of Foresight" (予知夢, Yochimu); 292. "Fog of Death" (死の霧, Shi no Kiri); 293. "Silent Darkness" (静寂なる闇, Seijaku Naru Yami); 294. "Exodus" (エクソダス, Ekusodasu); 295. "Shiva" (末神, Matsukami); 296. "The Heavens Shook" (轟天, Goten)
Aboard the Seahorse, Guts watches over Casca and Roderick inquires about the nature of their relationship. Casca falls overboard and Guts plunges into the ocean to rescue her. Three armored ships appear on the horizon and Roderick orders his forces to fire upon the pirates, obliterating two of their ships and forcing the pirate captain to withdraw. Guts, asleep in the hold, dreams of the Beast of Darkness who threatens to break its chains and consume him. On the deck, the crew celebrates their victory and Manifico asks Roderick to help him conquer the Elf Island. In Windham, the Knights of Arklow reflect on the events that transpired in Vritannis. A group of children tell them they collectively shared a dream about evacuating the city before dawn. In the castle, Emperor Ganishka lowers himself into his man-made beherit, heedlessly extinguishing all of the Kushan soldiers roaming the city. The Arklow Knights storm the castle grounds to liberate the women imprisoned therein and dress them in armor of the disintegrated Kushan guards. Outside the city, a former Kushan soldier, turned Band of the Hawk spy, helps the civilians bypass the Kushan army and the Clan of the Bakiraka. In the morning, Ganishka assumes his new form, a hellish monstrosity of flesh and sinew called Shiva that towers so high over the city, it blocks out the sun.
34	September 25, 2009	978-4-592-14434-2	September 15, 2010	978-1-59582-532-2
297. "Giant God of Blindness" (盲目の巨神, Mōmoku no Kyoshin); 298. "Demonic Release" (放魔, Hōma); 299. "Inhuman Battlefield" (人外の戦場, Jingai no Senjō); 300. "The Medium of the Hawk" (鷹の巫女, Taka no Miko); 301. "Chaos" (混沌, Konton); 302. "The Flight" (飛翔, Hishō); 303. "Backlighting" (逆光, Gyakkō); 304. "Fissure" (亀裂, Kiretsu); 305. "Creation" (開闢, Kaibyaku); 306. "Fantasia" (幻造世界(ファンタジア), Fantajia)
The towering Shiva, his ego dissolved, crushes all enemies and allies in his path. A swarm of his smaller monsters emerge to clash with Griffith's war demons. The humans rallied under the Band of the Hawk watch the battle in a mixture of awe and revulsion. Sonia telepathically wrests their attention, reminding them of the sacrifices the demons are making to fight their common enemy before charging headlong toward the monsters. Under Griffith's command, the army lures the monsters into a wall of cannon fire and arrows. Together, humans and apostles fight side-by-side while Griffith climbs the towering mass of Shiva atop Nosferatu Zodd. Shiva, meanwhile, flashes back to memories of betrayal and survival that led to Ganishka's incarnation as an apostle. His soliloquy is torn apart by the Sword of Actuation. Wielded by the Skull Knight, it was intended to strike Femto (Griffith's supernatural form), but Femto manipulates space to redirect the slash. It hits Shiva instead, opening a dimensional tear between the physical and astral worlds that releases a blast of pure spiritual energy.
35	September 29, 2010	978-4-592-14435-9	September 21, 2011	978-1-59582-695-4
307. "Falconia" (ファルコニア, Farukonia); Begin arc: "Fantasia Arc" (幻造世界編, Fantajia-hen) — "Elf Island Chapter" (妖精島の章, Yōseijima no Shō): 308–310. "Ghost Ship (1–3)" (幽霊船(1〜3), Yūreisen (1–3)); 311. "Solitary Island" (孤島, Kotō); 312. "Girl of the Roaring Torrent" (鳴る瀬ろの娘, Narusero no Musume); 313. "Denizens of the Sinister Sea" (禍海の者共, Magawada no Monodomo); 314. "Human Tentacles" (人触手, Hito Shokusha); 315. "The Tentacled Ship" (触手船, Shokusha Fune)
Out of the destruction of Ganishka's demonic form springs a new world in which creatures that once inhabited the imagination of mankind suddenly exist in corporeal form. Moreover, Ganishka's massive body, transfigured into a giant tree, stands at the gates of Falconia, the newly materialized capital city of the Hawk. Aboard the pirate ship, the superstitious crew questions their captain who remains hellbent on chasing down Roderick's warship to exact his revenge. The pirates close in on the Seahorse and attack with their transfigured tentacle-monster bodies. Guts singlehandedly repels the monsters while Roderick's crew blasts the ghost ship with cannon fire, forcing their retreat. Multiple leaks breech the hull, grounding the Seahorse on Solitary Island until repairs can be made. Isidro explores rocky outcroppings and finds an ominous looking sea cave but is cautioned against entering by a lone girl named Isma. Meanwhile, Guts and the crew visit the fishing village and stumble upon a statue of an ancient sea god. Schierke and Isidro dine with Isma and swap stories of their adventures for information on the island. Isma reveals that she is an outcast from the village because she is believed to be a Merrow. The tentacle-monsters attack and Guts fends them off until the ghost ship reappear and the pirates threaten to turn them into their monster brethren, whereupon Guts once again dons his berserker armor.
36	September 23, 2011	978-4-592-14436-6	September 19, 2012	978-1-59582-942-9
316–317. "Full Moon (1–2)" (満月(1〜2), Mangetsu (1–2)); 318. "Beastman" (獣士, Kedamono); 319–321. "Sea God (1–3)" (海神(1〜3), Kaijin (1–3)); 322. "Booming Art" (震臓, Shinzō); 323. "A Call from the Deep" (深き呼び声, Fukaki Yobigoe); 324. "Merrow (1)" (人魚(1), Merō (1))
On the cliffs above the battle, Schierke attempts to use her luminous body to help Guts regain control of his senses. Meanwhile, Casca darts into the fray to rescue a small child, the same child she found during the previous full moon. Guts, with Schierke's help, resists the overwhelming Od of his armor, and the crew regroups on the Seahorse to prepare for the final battle. Lady Farnese is tasked with casting a spell to defend the ship. Schierke possesses Guts to prevent him from going berserk and together they enter the sea cave where they are confronted once again by the monstrous pirates. Guts dodges their innumerable tentacles and leaps into the sea god's mouth. In his absence, the monsters attack the Seahorse but are stopped by Lady Farnese's spell. Only the ghost ship is capable of passing through their defense. Meanwhile, Guts climbs the masts of the ship graveyard within the sea god's stomach and fights the parasites residing therein. On deck, Isidro and the crew wage a fierce battle with the tentacled pirates. As Guts approaches the sea god's heart, it erupts from its cave and sends forth a tidal wave that knocks Isidro overboard. Isma dives into the water to save him and hears voices encouraging her to say her true name. She transforms into her Merrow form and joins her comrades in the fight against the sea god.
37	March 29, 2013	978-4-592-14437-3	November 20, 2013	978-1-61655-205-3
325. "Merrow (2)" (人魚(2), Merō (2)); 326. "Siren" (声連, Seiren); 327. "Surfacing" (浮上, Fujō); 328. "Shooting Star" (流星, Ryūsei); 329–331. "Spring Flowers of Distant Days (1–3)" (遠い日の春花(1〜3), Tōi Hi no Shunka (1–3)); 332. "Covered Wagon" (幌馬車, Horobasha); 333. "Paradise" (楽土, Paradaisu)
Aboard the Seahorse, Roderick commands his crew to bombard the sea god, and Isma reunites with her mother. Guts flounders against the booming heartbeat of the massive beast. The song of the Merrow negates the deafening intensity of the sea god's pulse, giving Guts a chance to deal a lethal strike. The sea god collapses with Guts still inside. He tries cutting himself out but is inundated by muck. A body composed of light appears before him, guiding him to the surface. Back on the ship, the Lady Farnese and Schierke heal Guts as the Merrow escort them to Elf Island. Casca, meanwhile, frantically searches for the child who disappeared without a trace. Schierke conjectures that he is an emissary from Elf Island. Guts flashes back to a time in his life when he was imprisoned and used by another as a decoy. While imprisoned, Guts met the spirit of a flower growing in his cell named Chitch who heals his wounds with her leaves. He promises to transplant Chitch's flower once he is freed but wakes up alone to find it wilted and dying. Forced to duel a Viscount's son, Guts is saved by the man who took advantage of him and his mercenaries. Finally free, Guts scatters Chitch's flower among other spring flowers of its kind. Meanwhile, Rickert, Erica and others flee from rampaging horde of trolls. They are saved by the reborn Band of the Hawk but not before a cockatrice appears. Irvine, the archer, fells the monster in his apostle form with a single arrow and the knights safely usher the refugees to the fertile lands of Falconia.
38	June 24, 2016	978-4-592-14438-0	July 5, 2017	978-1-5067-0398-5
334. "City of Men" (人の都, Hito no Miyako); 335. "The Divine Right of Kings" (王權神授, Ōken Shinju); 336. "Pandemonium" (万魔殿, Ban-maden); 337. "Bridge of Parting" (別離の橋, Betsuri no Hashi); 338. "Twilight Assassin" (夕闇の死客, Yūyami no Shikaku); 339. "Royal Capital in the Moonlight" (月下の王都, Gekka no Ōto); 340. "Night Fight" (暗闘, Antō); 341. "Soaring Escape" (逃飛翔, Tō Hishō); 342. "Landfall" (上陸, Jōriku)
Awestruck, Rickert and Erica pass through the gates into the capital city of Falconia. At the refugee bureau, they are assigned temporary housing and Rickert is given a letter of recommendation for an audience with Griffith. They meet Luca who is in charge of their lodgings and Erica accompanies her to a bathhouse. Ricket makes his way to the castle the following afternoon and is welcomed by Sir Owen, Head of Falconia's Caste Guard. Inside, the Pontiff conducts funeral rites for the knights and refugees who died en route to the castle, and Griffith reanimates the spirits of the deceased so they can bid farewell to their loved ones. Sir Locus takes Rickert aside and asks why he requested an audience with Griffith, insinuating Rickert will inquire about the eclipse that he survived unscathed. Sir Locus shows him Pandemonium, the den of the war demons, to demonstrate how Griffith has created a utopia both by turning the apostles into a weapon and by empowering humans to overcome their fear of death. In the castle gardens, Griffith and the others drink tea after the funeral ceremony. Rickert arrives feeling uncertain about all that he has witnessed. Griffith asks him if he will "still dream the same dream", and Rickert slaps him in reply, stating that he was a member of the Band of the Hawk, led by Griffith, the White Hawk, not the Hawk of Light. Back at their lodgings, Rickert confides in Luca that he will not stay in the city. While ruminating on which path to take, he is attacked by the assassin Rakshas, only to be saved by the Bakiraka. He takes them to their lodgings and tells Luca and the others that he will be fleeing the city with Erica that night. Rakshas returns and battles Silat hand-to-hand before being set ablaze by the Tapasa. Rakshas captures Erica and attempts to slice her in half to extinguish the flames with her blood. She is saved by General Daiba, the high sorcerer. The group flees on Garuda but are pursued by Rakshas. Rickert blasts it with a hand-held cannon and they escape into the night. Meanwhile, Guts and the crew arrive at Elfhelm and are warned by the Merrow that the flow of time is different on Skellig Island. They venture inland and encounter a barrier meant to turn away tresspassers. Following Puck, they pass through the barrier and approach a field of crops guarded by magically animated scarecrows.
39	June 23, 2017	978-4-592-14439-7	July 11, 2018	978-1-5067-0708-2
343. "Flame Puppet" (炎の人形, Honō no Ningyō); 344. "Village of Witches" (魔女の村, Majo no Mura); 345. "Great Gurus" (大導師, Daidōshi); 346. "Elfhelm" (妖精郷, Erufuherumu); 347. "The Flower Storm Monarch" (花吹雪く王, Hana Fubuku Ō); 348. "Dimly Lit Wasteland" (薄闇の荒野, Usukuragari no Kōya); 349. "The Corridor of Dreams" (夢の回廊, Yume no Kairō); 350. "Fragments of Memory" (記憶の欠片, Kioku no Kakera)
Guts and his crew battle enchanted assailants blocking the path to Elfhelm. Schierke dispels them with magic, provoking a young witch named Molda to attack with a blazing wicker man, much to the chagrin of her peers. Guts obliterates the wicker man with his cannon, spreading fire in all directions. An old mage named Gedfring arrives riding a goat, manipulates the weather to extinguish the flames, greets the troupe, recounts a prophecy foretelling their arrival at the hands of Puck, and leads them through a magical forest to a village of hat-shaped homes beneath giant trees. Young mages gather there to hone their skills under old gurus. Gedfring brings them to a great hall, where they meet Danan the Domestic and other gurus. Guts implores an immediate audience with the Ruler of the Elves but is persuaded to wait until the group recovers. Over dinner, the crew recounts their adventures, and the gurus explain the connection between the World Tree and the forest of the spirit tree, whose parasitic entities once siphoned power from the World Tree. After their destruction, the World Tree formed a fissure connecting the physical and astral worlds. The group then travels deep into the forest, encountering elves and mythical fae. Magnifico reminds Puck of their plan to usurp the throne; Puck proclaims himself Elven King, but both are arrested for treason. Danan reveals herself as The Flower Storm Monarch, the true Elven Ruler, and offers to perform the Corridor of Dreams ritual to restore Casca's fractured mind, entrusting Farnese and Schierke to enter her subconscious. They follow cherry petals through their dreams to a wasteland under a black sun, finding an impaled dog—missing a foreleg and branded—chained to a casket containing a broken doll with a tiny Casca inside. Meanwhile, the elves feast their guests. In Casca's mind, Farnese and Schierke repair the doll with shards of her fragmented memories, revealing her past as a soldier and her relationships with Guts and Griffith.
40	September 28, 2018	978-4-592-14440-3	September 25, 2019	978-1-5067-1498-1
351. "Forest of Corpses and Thorned Cedars" (屍と針杉の森, Shikabane to Harisugi no Mori); 352. "Main Culprits" (元凶, Genkyō); 353. "The Final Fragment" (最後の欠片, Saigo no Kakera); 354. "Awakening" (覚醒, Mezame); 355. "On the Sun-Dappled Ground" (木漏れ日の下で, Komorebi no Shita de); 356. "Jötunn" (巨人, Yotun); 357. "Triumphant Return at Dawn" (有明の凱旋, Ariake no Gaisen)
Schierke and Farnese enter a forest of corpses and thorned cedar trees, where phallic monsters descend upon them. Schierke repels the attack with magical fetishes, but the monsters pursue them deeper into the forest. Farnese throws the head of Lord Mozgus from her original laundry dream to ensnare the creatures. They reach the thorn-encrusted summit of Casca's final fragmented memory, where a winged guardian attacks and the surrounding miasma transforms into apostles. Schierke summons her fetishes for defense, but the guardian seizes the casket and the hound, then drops them from a great height. Lady Farnese, wearing Serpico's Sylph Hood, softens their fall. The guardian attacks again, severing the chain binding the hound to the casket; the Berserker suit springs from Farnese's bag, and the armored hound unleashes a terrifying assault on the apostles. Defenseless, Schierke and Farnese take the casket and flee toward the final fragment, but spawning apostles converge on them. A voice from the ether speaks of a final weapon, and Schierke's mistress appears, bursts into flames, and douses the apostles, clearing a path to the demon fetus. Encircled by thorns and apostles, Casca's screams and traumatic memories transform the fetus into a thorn-encrusted heart. As they hesitate to return the cursed heart to the doll, the winged guardian breaks through and tries to steal it. The berserker hound fends it off briefly, allowing them to place the heart into Casca's vessel. Back among the mushrooms, Danan welcomes them, and Casca thanks her companions, describing the experience as waking from a dream in which she watched the world without thought or feeling, remembering nothing past rescuing Griffith. Danan gives her an Elvish dress, and Casca departs to reunite with Guts. Memories of loved ones arise, but as Guts approaches, her traumas return. Meanwhile, the Hawk of Light and his army engage the Jötnar on a battlefield; war demons dismember their hydra, Griffith slays their king, and Sonia directs the army to a touchstone atop a nearby hill, which they use to fast-travel through the sky to Falconia within the branches of the World Tree.
41	December 24, 2021	978-4-592-16691-7; 978-4-592-10629-6 (SE)	November 2, 2022	978-1-5067-3377-7
358. "The Dawn of an Empire" (帝国の黎明, Teikoku no Reimei); 359. "Barrier" (障壁, Shōheki); 360. "The Cherry Orchard" (桜の園, Sakura no Sono); 361. "The Ravine" (渓谷, Keikoku); 362. "Death Vision" (幻死, Genshi); 363. "Leaping Monkey" (跳猿, Chōen); 364. "Tears of Morning Dew" (朝露の涙, Asatsuyu no Namida)
The heads of state in Falconia report to Griffith on the state of their new kingdom. Sir Locus describes the military's domain reclamation efforts, while Sir Owen expresses concern that the city's demographic makeup may threaten the existing order. Princess Charlotte proposes establishing an orphanage, but the noblemen reject the idea. Griffith supports it as part of his vision for prosperity, which includes universal public education to cultivate an empowered citizenry. The nobles question funding, and Griffith suggests incorporating refugees into the army and using their labor to construct roadways and towns as territory is reclaimed. In Elfhelm, Danan cuts Casca's hair and adorns her with forest sentinel clothes and a sword. Casca thanks those who safeguarded her during her vulnerable state and impresses them with her sword skills. She approaches Guts from behind a tree, commending his companions, but traumatic memories of the eclipse incapacitate her. Farnese and Schierke join magic training, astonishing young mages with their mastery of the "Formation of the Four" and spirit summoning. Gedfring offers to teach Schierke about communing with daimons and encourages Farnese to learn healing magic. Guts, joined by the Skull Knight and Gedfring, ventures to the Forest of Stone to visit Hanarr, the Dwarven craftsman who forged the berserker armor. Hanarr warns against the armor's ability to consume its owner, then provokes it to reveal its bloody memories. Schierke suppresses Guts's berserker rage, and they learn the armor belonged to the Skull Knight, who loved the Lady Maiden of the Cherry Blossoms. Later, the mysterious child appears on the night of the full moon and leads Guts to the others. Danan confirms she did not take the child's form; the island's affinity guided him. The child remains and, as Casca sleeps, transforms into a young version of Griffith.
42	September 29, 2023	978-4-592-16692-4; 978-4-592-10635-7 (SE)	March 18, 2025	978-1-5067-4641-8
365. "Stillness Following the Full Moon" (十六夜のしじま, Izayoi no Shijima); 366. "Eye of the Maelstrom" (潮流の目, Maerusutoromu no Me); 367. "Petals Into Thin Air" (桜散霧消, Ōsanmushō); 368. "The Corroders" (蝕む者たち, Mushibamu Monotachi); 369. "The Fleeting Crescent Island" (泡沫の孤島, Utakata no Kotō); 370. "Refugees on the Western Sea" (西海の流民, Saikai no Ryūmin); 371. "A Dying Light in the Night's Dark Confines" (狭き暗夜に消ゆる灯火, Semaki An'ya ni Kiyuru Tomoshibi); 372. "The Red Raven Sleeps in Her Cage" (赤の渡鴉は鳥籠で眠る, Aka no Watarigarasu wa Torikago de Nemuru); 373. "The Crippled Rusty Frame" (歩みかなわぬ錆びた鉄輪, Ayumi Kanawanu Sabita Kanawa)
Across Skellig, magical creatures sense a new arrival. When Casca sees Griffith standing before her, images of her torment flash through her mind. She screams, and the brand on her chest oozes. Guts heaves his sword and launches a frenzied attack. Schierke prepares to fight Griffith's maelstrom, but Farnese stops her. Puck senses another arrival just as Nosferatu Zodd crashes onto the island. Griffith approaches Casca and embraces her. Guts swings his sword at his enemy, but the blade cannot touch him. An ominous wind blows the blossoms off the giant cherry tree as the ground beneath them begins to crumble. Black, globular creatures ooze out of the crevasses, and Roderick orders his crew to evacuate. Standing in Zodd's massive paw, Griffith carries Casca into the night, leaving Guts to clutch his sword in agony as the island crumbles around him. Danan tells her companions it is time to leave this world. Isma and the other magical creatures then dissipate into the night. Aboard the Seahorse, Serpico finds Farnese and Schierke unharmed. Molda appears and asks Farnese to help her tend to the wounded. Schierke leaves to find Guts, who has collapsed in the ship's storeroom, overcome by grief and despair. Meanwhile, Casca awakes from what she believes was a dream in a sun-strewn bedchamber. Maids adorn her with a crimson dress, and she spends the day in a garden. She then eats a sumptuous meal and settles into a bath, whose droplets cause her to recall an image of Danan, Schierke, and Farnese. Determined to escape, Casca attacks the guards, but they subdue her. Schierke tries to find Casca using her magical power of perception. As Guts battles the temptations of his armor, the ship is overrun by Kushan forces.
43	August 29, 2025	978-4-592-16693-1; 978-4-592-10640-1 (SE)	November 24, 2026	978-1-5067-5727-8
374. "Is the Sleeping Black Beast But Biding its Time?" (眠れる黒の獣はただ静かに佇むのか, Nemureru Kuro no Kemono wa Tada Shizuka ni Tatazumu no ka); 375. "Dawn Breaks on the Unyielding Fog of Night" (晴れぬ夜霧の朝まだき, Harenu Yogiri no Asamadaki); 376. "Sea's Quivering Surface and Calamitous War's Shadow" (震える海面と悲惨な戦争の影, Furueru Kaimen to Hisan'na Sensō no Kage); 377. "Snake in One's Bosom" (胸の中の蛇, Mune no Naka no Hebi); 378. "Invited Assassin" (招かれし刺客, Maneka Reshi Shikaku); 379. "Those Who Dance Through the Depths of Hell" (阿鼻無間に踊る者たち, Abi Mugen ni Odoru-sha-tachi); 380. "Shadows Die Twice" (影は二度死ぬ, Kage wa ni-do Shinu); 381. "A Crescent Moon Shines on the Exile's Back" (弦月は流刑人の背を照らす, Gengetsu wa Rukeinin no se o Terasu); 382. "Tomb" (玄室, Genshitsu)
On deck, Serpico is surrounded by Kushan invaders. He vaults the ship's railing and escapes to the lower deck, watching through a window as his companions are taken prisoner. The invaders enter the storeroom and find Guts collapsed on the floor. Meanwhile, Roderick fails to negotiate with the invaders and questions why they were not killed instantly. Silat, head of the Bakiraka, and General Daiba preside over the seizure of the warship. Chained, Guts is paraded on the top deck and refuses to resist despite Isidro's provocations. A small figure in Kushan armor kneels before Guts and reveals himself as Rickert. Guts wakes chained in a cell as Rickert protests his imprisonment. Daiba escorts Rickert to Schierke's bedside in the Kushan palace, where her companions, including the mages from Elfhelm, anxiously wait for her to awaken. Silat apologizes for their treatment aboard the Seahorse and hands them over to Daiba. As refugees, Kushan custom requires them to serve in the military. The Great Kushan Emperor arrives to chair the Kurultai, a secret military summit, in preparation for war with Falconia. Before the summit begins, the head of the northern clan demands that Silat be excluded as head of the Bakiraka, but his request is denied. Daiba recounts the war between Ganishka and the Falcon of Light, after which Silat requests command of the Kushan army. The northern clan head protests as black barbs protrude from his skin. Rakshas, the apostle, emerges from his corpse, and a funnel cloud descends upon the palace. Trolls emerge from inky pools of the Qliphoth domain oozing from the city's cobblestones. Silat orders Daiba to project his voice across the city, urging resistance. Coordinating their attacks, Daiba and Silat force Rakshas to flee. Spotting Guts in his cell, Rakshas sneaks into the dungeons. Guts welcomes death at Rakshas's hands but is saved when Silat deals a killing blow. As the city reels, Schierke's astral body arrives in Falconia. Back at the palace, most generals and clan leaders are dead. Kushan monks arrive with Guts to perform mourning rites for the slain. Daiba explains that Guts lured the calamity as bearer of the cursed brand. The Emperor commands that he be shackled in chains at the far end of the world. The monks lead Guts to an ancient burial ground, where he is interred within a stone stupa. Alone in his tomb without sight or sound, he sinks into his own darkness.

== Chapters not released in collected volumes ==
The following have not been released in collected volumes:

- 083. "God of the Abyss (2)" (深淵の神(2), Shin'en no Kami (2); omitted from volume 13)
- 383. "Anadi-avidya" (無明無始, Mumyō Mushi)
- 384. "The Shifting Mirrorlike Waters and the Lingering Glow of Eidolic Fires" (移ろの水鏡と幽炎の余光, Utsuro no Mizukagami to Kasoke-en no Yokō)
- 385. "The Tide Turns" (一陽来復, Ichiyōraifuku)
- 386. "Can You Catch Hold of a Migrating Bird in the Clouds?" (君は雲中の渡り鳥を掴めるか, Kimi wa Kumo-chū no Wataridori o Tsukameru ka)

== Deluxe volumes ==
Since 2019, Dark Horse Comics publishes larger, hardcover "deluxe" volumes, each of which collects three of the regular volumes, except the 14th volume, which collects two regular volumes as well as the Berserk Official Guidebook.

No.	Release date	ISBN	Collects
1	February 27, 2019	978-1-5067-1198-0	Volumes 1–3
2	June 26, 2019	978-1-5067-1199-7	Volumes 4–6
3	October 23, 2019	978-1-5067-1200-0	Volumes 7–9
4	February 26, 2020	978-1-5067-1521-6	Volumes 10–12
5	June 24, 2020	978-1-5067-1522-3	Volumes 13–15
6	November 18, 2020	978-1-5067-1523-0	Volumes 16–18
7	March 10, 2021	978-1-5067-1790-6	Volumes 19–21
8	August 25, 2021	978-1-5067-1791-3	Volumes 22–24
9	November 10, 2021	978-1-5067-1792-0	Volumes 25–27
10	March 9, 2022	978-1-5067-2754-7	Volumes 28–30
11	August 10, 2022	978-1-5067-2755-4	Volumes 31–33
12	November 9, 2022	978-1-5067-2756-1	Volumes 34–36
13	March 8, 2023	978-1-5067-2757-8	Volumes 37–39
14	November 22, 2023	978-1-5067-4106-2	Volumes 40–41 + Guidebook
