= List of Berserk characters =

A selection of characters from the series, including Guts (front) and his party (from bottom left to right): Azan, Isidro, and Isma; (second row, left to right) Schierke, Farnese of Vandimion, and Casca; (third row, left to right) Serpico, Roderick of Schtauffen, and Manifico de Vandimion; (top right) Ivalera, and (above) Puck

The Japanese manga series Berserk and its adaptations feature a cast of characters created by Kentaro Miura. The series takes place in a dark fantasy setting loosely based on medieval Europe. Berserk follows the intertwined fates of the swordsman Guts and Griffith, leader of the mercenary Band of the Hawk. The narrative explores Griffith's demonic transformation after forming a pact with supernatural forces, and the profound consequences this has on both characters.

== Main characters ==
=== Guts ===
Voiced by: Nobutoshi Canna (1997 series, Sword of the Berserk: Guts' Rage, and Berserk: Millennium Falcon Hen Seima Senki no Shō), Orine Fukushima (young; 1997 series), Hiroaki Iwanaga (The Golden Age Arc, 2016 series and Berserk and the Band of the Hawk), Jun Inoue (young; The Golden Age Arc) (Japanese); Marc Diraison (1997 series and The Golden Age Arc), Maria Dente (young; 1997 series), Colin DePaula (young; The Golden Age Arc), Kaiji Tang (2016 series), Michael Bell (Sword of the Berserk: Guts' Rage) (English)

Guts (ガッツ, Gattsu) is a wandering mercenary who fights for various companies before being defeated by Griffith and forced into the Band of the Hawk. Raised in a mercenary band by Shisu, a kind prostitute, and later by its leader, Gambino, Guts eventually joins—and later leaves—the Band of the Hawk. His complex relationship with Griffith drives much of the series's story. After the Eclipse, where he loses his left forearm and right eye, Guts swears revenge against Griffith, reborn as the godlike Femto. He eventually becomes known as the "Black Swordsman" (黒い剣士, Kuroi Kenshi). Following a two-year separation, he reunites with Casca and, after the Incarnation Ceremony, sets out with a new group of companions.

=== Griffith ===
Voiced by: Toshiyuki Morikawa (1997 series and Berserk: Millennium Falcon Hen Seima Senki no Shō), Minami Takayama (young; 1997 series), Takahiro Sakurai (The Golden Age Arc and 2016 series), Ayako Takeuchi (young; The Golden Age Arc) (Japanese); Kevin T. Collins (1997 series and The Golden Age Arc), Veronica Taylor (young; 1997 series), Janis Carroll (young; The Golden Age Arc), Steve Cannon (2016 series) (English)

Griffith (グリフィス, Gurifisu), the "White Hawk", leads the mercenary Band of the Hawk with unmatched skill and ambition. His rise to power in Midland's war against Tudor is tied to the Crimson Behelit, an "Egg of the King" prophesied to grant power. His downfall begins when Guts leaves the Hawks, leading Griffith to recklessly seduce Princess Charlotte. After a year of torture, he sacrifices his followers to become Femto (フェムト, Femuto), a demonic God Hand member. Reborn through the Incarnation Ceremony, Griffith rebuilds his army with Apostles, conquers Midland, and defeats the Kushan Empire. He merges the physical and astral worlds, establishing the utopian Falconia as his kingdom. As Femto, he wields godlike powers including causality manipulation and spatial manipulation.

=== Casca ===
Voiced by: Yūko Miyamura (1997 series, Sword of the Berserk: Guts' Rage, and Millennium Falcon Hen Seima Senki no Shō), Toa Yukinari (The Golden Age Arc and 2016 series) (Japanese); Carrie Keranen (1997 series and The Golden Age Arc), Karen Strassman (2016 series), B. J. Ward (Sword of the Berserk: Guts' Rage) (English)

Casca (キャスカ, Kyasuka) is the only woman in the original Band of the Hawk and its third-strongest fighter after Griffith and Guts. Rescued by Griffith from a nobleman who bought her as a child, she develops fierce loyalty and unrequited love for him. Initially hostile toward Guts, she grows closer to him after he saves her multiple times. When Guts departs, she fails to stop him. After Griffith's capture, she leads the surviving Hawks but blames Guts upon his return, attempting suicide before he intervenes. They confess their feelings and rescue Griffith, who betrays them during the Eclipse, raping Casca and reducing her to a childlike state. Branded and hunted, she births a corrupted child and later wanders to St. Albion, where Guts saves her from fanatics. Though distrustful after his accidental violence, she slowly regains faith in him. Farnese and Schierke restore her mind in Elfhelm, but she remains distant before Griffith takes her.

== The Band of the Hawk ==
The original Band of the Hawk (鷹の団, Taka no Dan) during the Golden Age arc was a group of mercenaries led by Griffith, who achieved great exploits on the battlefield during the hundred-year war. But after Griffith was rescued by his imprisonment, broken and mutilated from the year-long torture, the Hawks were offered up by their leader for the Eclipse ritual. Guts, Casca, and Rickert, the only members of the group not to be taken into the Nexus, are the sole survivors while the rest were all devoured and slaughtered by the gathered Apostles while Griffith used their souls to be reborn as Femto.

=== Judeau ===
Voiced by: Akira Ishida (1997 series and Berserk: Millennium Falcon Hen Seima Senki no Shō), Yūki Kaji (The Golden Age Arc and 2016 series) (Japanese); Christopher Kromer (1997 series and The Golden Age Arc), Kyle McCarley (2016 series) (English)

Judeau (ジュドー, Judō) is a skilled fighter and former circus performer in the original Band of the Hawk, renowned for his knife-throwing abilities. His greatest strength lies in emotional perceptiveness, demonstrated when he recognizes the developing bond between Guts and Casca before they acknowledge it themselves. As a patient and pragmatic voice of reason, he often mediates conflicts among more temperamental members like Corkus.

Judeau maintains an easygoing demeanor while prioritizing his comrades' welfare above his own. Though proficient in many skills, he excels in none particular. He harbors unrequited love for Casca throughout his service, but respects her growing connection with Guts too deeply to act on these feelings. During the Eclipse, his loyalty to Casca as commander compels him to aid her escape, resulting in his death while protecting her from attacking Apostles.

=== Pippin ===
Voiced by: Masuo Amada (1997 series and Berserk: Millennium Falcon Hen Seima Senki no Shō), Takahiro Fujiwara (The Golden Age Arc) (Japanese); Jeff Ward (1997 series), Patrick Seitz (The Golden Age Arc) (English)

Pippin (ピピン, Pipin) is a powerfully built warrior in the original Band of the Hawk who wields an enormous mace. A former miner, his exceptional strength and keen senses prove invaluable to the group, most notably when he detects the Midland army's ambush following Griffith's capture. Despite his intimidating size, he maintains a calm temperament, exemplified when he patiently escorts a resistant Guts to celebrations despite being struck.

Pippin speaks sparingly, an attribute that belies his intelligence. He develops a protective, brotherly relationship with Rickert during their service. During the Eclipse, he sacrifices himself to delay an Apostle's advance, allowing Casca and Judeau to flee. His hollowed corpse later appears briefly before being destroyed by the Count.

=== Corkus ===
Voiced by: Tomohiro Nishimura (1997 series and Berserk: Millennium Falcon Hen Seima Senki no Shō), Yoshirō Matsumoto (The Golden Age Arc) (Japanese); Marc Sebastian (1997 series), Doug Erholtz (The Golden Age Arc) (English)

Corkus (コルカス, Korukasu) is a brash former bandit leader who joins the Band of the Hawk. His initial attempt to rob Guts after the Bazuso confrontation ends in failure, requiring intervention from Casca and Griffith. This humiliation fosters lasting resentment toward Guts, though Corkus remains unconvinced of Guts' significance to the Hawks when others blame him for Griffith's capture.

Despite his abrasive personality, Corkus demonstrates fierce loyalty to the Band. During the Eclipse, Corkus went into denial from shock at his hellish surroundings, before being killed by a nameless female Apostle who swallowed his head. Guts later encounters this Apostle in the Black Swordsman arc, feigning seduction to exact vengeance for Corkus' death.

=== Rickert ===
Voiced by: Akiko Yajima (1997 series), Minako Kotobuki (The Golden Age Arc and 2016 series) (Japanese); Michelle Newman (1997 series and The Golden Age Arc), Erica Mendez (2016 series) (English)

Rickert (リッケルト, Rikkeruto) is the youngest survivor of the original Band of the Hawk, having avoided the Eclipse by absence. After the group's destruction, he apprentices under blacksmith Godo for two years, crafting memorial swords for his fallen comrades that create the landmark "Hill of Swords". He later modifies Guts' armor and provides him with a repeating crossbow.

When Guts confronts Griffith at the memorial site, Rickert learns of Griffith's betrayal that doomed their comrades. Despite Griffith's offer to join his new Band of the Hawk, Rickert refuses after witnessing Zodd's destruction of Godo's mine. Traveling to Falconia with Erica, Godo's granddaughter, he acknowledges Griffith's civic achievements but ultimately rejects him, declaring the Griffith he followed dead. This defiance nearly costs him his life when Rakshas attacks, though Silat's timely intervention saves him.

=== Gaston ===
Voiced by: Masahito Kawanago (1997 series), Kazuki Yao (The Golden Age Arc) (Japanese); Sean Schemmel (1997 series and The Golden Age Arc) (English)

Gaston (ガストン, Gasuton) serves as second-in-command of Guts' Raiders within the Band of the Hawk, demonstrating both professional respect and personal friendship toward Guts. During the assault on a Tudor stronghold, he attempts to restrain Guts from confronting Zodd, an act that nearly costs him his life. Following the Doldrey campaign, Gaston temporarily leaves the Hawks to establish a clothing shop in Wyndham using his mercenary earnings. He abandons this venture when the Band is exiled, rejoining out of loyalty to his comrades.

Shortly before the Eclipse, Gaston and fellow Raiders express their desire to accompany Guts on future campaigns. During the catastrophic event, he becomes the last Raider to perish when a demon erupts from his skull as Guts discovers him mortally wounded.

== Guts' Party ==
=== Puck ===
Voiced by: Yuriko Fuchizaki (Sword of the Berserk: Guts' Rage, Berserk: Millennium Falcon Hen Seima Senki no Shō), Kaoru Mizuhara (2016 series) (Japanese); Cam Clarke (Sword of the Berserk: Guts' Rage), Sarah Anne Williams (2016 series) (English)

Puck (パック, Pakku) is a wind spirit originating from Elfhelm, a utopian island in the Western Sea. As an elf, he remains invisible to close-minded individuals, particularly the devoutly religious, though he can interact with them unnoticed. Puck possesses several abilities, including healing powder secreted from his wings and a blinding flash emitted from his body. His "Bloody Needle" attack involves throwing chestnuts with enough force to cause pain but no serious injury.

The first companion to join Guts' journey, Puck develops an unusual fascination with the Behelit obtained after Guts' battle with the Count. Initially serving as a cheerful counterbalance to Guts' dark persona during the Black Swordsman arc, Puck's role gradually shifts toward comic relief. He frequently appears in exaggerated comedic scenes alongside Isidro and maintains a playful sibling-like relationship with the elf Ivalera, who shares his humorous function in the narrative.

=== Farnese de Vandimion ===
Voiced by: Yūko Gotō (Berserk: Millennium Falcon Hen Seima Senki no Shō), Yōko Hikasa (2016 series) (Japanese); Erica Lindbeck (2016 series) (English)

Farnese de Vandimion (ファルネーゼ・ド・ヴァンディミオン, Farunēze do Vandimion) is a noblewoman who commands the Holy Iron Chain Knights, a ceremonial guard traditionally led by women. Her father Federico de Vandimion secures her this position during her convent stay. Farnese exhibits pyromaniacal tendencies, deriving secret sadistic pleasure from burning alleged witches and pagans, though she denies these impulses.

After witnessing the events at Albion and Griffith's reincarnation, Farnese abandons her post alongside Serpico. She joins Guts' party to broaden her worldview, undergoing significant personal growth. Under Schierke's guidance, she studies witchcraft while primarily serving as Casca's caretaker. Farnese develops romantic feelings for Guts but remains focused on her duties. For protection, she wields silver chain mail and a short sword, later acquiring a magical ring that controls rose vine snakes and begins learning basic spellcraft.

=== Serpico ===
Voiced by: Takahiro Mizushima (Berserk: Millennium Falcon Hen Seima Senki no Shō), Kazuyuki Okitsu (2016 series) (Japanese); Max Mittelman (2016 series) (English)

Serpico (セルピコ, Serupiko) is Farnese's companion and, unknown to her, her half-brother. As herald of the Holy Iron Chain Knights, his unassuming appearance belies formidable combat skills with a rapier, earning him comparisons to a fox for his cunning and speed. Despite Farnese's past abuse, including forcing him to execute his own mother, he remains devoted to her since she rescued him from a snowy street years prior.

Serpico maintains a contentious relationship with Guts, initially distrusting him for endangering Farnese. After their duel in Vritannis, where Guts spares his life, Serpico develops cautious trust in Guts' protection. He wields Sylph-blessed equipment: a wind-generating rapier and a vortex-creating cloak that deflects projectiles and cushions falls. His genuine appreciation and clever nature forge an unusually strong bond with the wind spirits.

=== Isidro ===
Voiced by: Hiroyuki Yoshino (Berserk: Millennium Falcon Hen Seima Senki no Shō), Hiro Shimono (2016 series) (Japanese); Erik Scott Kimerer (2016 series) (English)

Isidro (イシドロ, Ishidoro) is a runaway thief who aspires to become a swordsman. After Guts saves him from Kushan Bākiraka warriors, he follows Guts to study his combat techniques. Though unskilled with swords, he demonstrates exceptional throwing accuracy. He exhibits visible discomfort when questioned about his parents, suggesting unresolved familial issues.

Flora provides him with the Salamander Dagger, a fire-imbued weapon, while Morgan gifts him a cutlass. His reckless behavior frequently clashes with Schierke's disciplined nature. Despite his brash personality, Isidro proves more perceptive than his noble counterpart Mule, recognizing Falconia's artificial paradise for what it is.

=== Schierke ===
Voiced by: Yukana (Berserk: Millennium Falcon Hen Seima Senki no Shō), Chiwa Saitō (2016 series) (Japanese); Mela Lee (2016 series) (English)

Schierke (シールケ, Shīruke) is a young witch and former apprentice of Flora who joins Guts' party during the troll infestation in Enoch Village. Accompanied by her elf companion Ivalera, she reluctantly adapts to life outside her sheltered existence after Griffith's forces destroy Flora's home. Despite her disdain for human society and Holy See doctrine, she proves invaluable to the group through her mastery of hypnosis, sensory manipulation, and ability to perceive Od. Schierke frequently employs dangerous magic in combat situations, particularly to stabilize Guts when he uses the Berserker Armor. Her initial dislike of Guts develops into a protective, almost filial bond, leading her to refuse Sonia's invitation to join the Band of the Hawk. She maintains a bickering yet affectionate dynamic with Isidro, frequently exasperated by his antics.

=== Ivalera ===
Voiced by: Yukari Tamura (Berserk: Millennium Falcon Hen Seima Senki no Shō), Satomi Arai (2016 series) (Japanese); Tara Sands (2016 series) (English)

Ivalera (イバレラ, Ibarera) is an elf assigned by Flora to monitor Schierke. She serves as an important communicator, relaying information about Schierke's condition to Guts' party when the young witch enters magical trances. Though fulfilling this serious role, Ivalera primarily functions as comic relief, frequently teasing Farnese about her insecurities and mocking Schierke's affection for Guts. She maintains a contentious yet sibling-like relationship with Puck, engaging in constant playful bickering with her fellow elf.

=== Manifico de Vandimion ===
Manifico de Vandimion (マニフィコ・ド・ヴァンディミオン, Manifiko do Vandimion) is Federico de Vandimion's son and Farnese's brother. Considered less capable than his siblings, he receives minor family responsibilities. Seeking advancement, he arranges Farnese's marriage to Roderick and later attempts to exploit Elfhelm's elves for profit. After Roderick refuses assistance, Manifico manipulates Puck into aiding his scheme by promising him Elfhelm's crown. When discovered, Elfhelm's inhabitants sentence him to community service.

=== Azan ===
Voiced by: Hiroki Yasumoto (2016 series) (Japanese); Richard Epcar (2016 series) (English)

Azan (アザン) is a former Holy Iron Chain Knight who served as Farnese's second-in-command. A stout, bald warrior with traditional values, he wields a quarterstaff with exceptional skill and maintains an honorable code, even defending defeated enemies like Guts. Known as "The Bridge Knight" for his legendary defense of a bridge against bandits, he later joins Guts' party after being expelled from the Knights following the Albion incident. During their sea voyage, he serves as a deckhand and trains Isidro in combat.

=== Roderick of Schtauffen ===
Voiced by: Nobutoshi Canna (drama CD)

Roderick of Schtauffen (ロデリック・オブ・シュタウフェン, Roderikku obu Shutaufen) is the third prince of Iith nation and captain of the Seahorse. An ambitious sailor advocating maritime expansion, he struggles for recognition among his inward-focused peers. Entering an arranged marriage with Farnese for political gain, he develops genuine interest in her. A charismatic leader with swordsmanship skills, Roderick fearlessly faces supernatural threats despite inadequate equipment. Known as the "Prince of the Seas" for sinking five Tudor ships single-handedly, he transports Guts' party to Skellig aboard his ship.

=== Isma ===
Isma (イスマ, Isuma) is a cheerful but isolated teenage fishergirl ostracized by her island community due to her merrow ancestry. After her human father dies at sea, she grows up curious about her absent merrow mother, who left a protective charm. When Guts' party arrives, Isma discovers her heritage is real. During an attack by the Sea God, she learns her true name, gains merrow transformation abilities, and reunites with her mother. With her home destroyed, she joins Guts' crew aboard the Seahorse on their journey to Elfhelm.

== Antagonists ==
=== The God Hand ===
The God Hand (ゴッドハンド, Goddo Hando) are supreme entities that manipulate the world of Berserk on behalf of the Idea of Evil, a primordial being born from humanity's collective need for a source of suffering. They manifest through Crimson Behelits during Eclipse ceremonies, which occur every 216 years to induct new members like Griffith. These events require mass human sacrifices, branding victims to transform them into lesser Apostles.

Unlike their Apostle servants, the God Hand lack permanent physical forms in the mortal realm, requiring temporary vessels or rare Incarnation Ceremonies to manifest. Griffith achieves full incarnation after the Albion catastrophe, using Ganishka's defeat to merge the astral and physical planes. This event subsequently enables the remaining God Hand members to incarnate.

==== Void ====
Voiced by: Unshō Ishizuka (1997 series and Berserk: Millennium Falcon Hen Seima Senki no Shō), Shinji Ogawa (The Golden Age Arc) (Japanese); Jon Avner (1997 series and The Golden Age Arc) (English)

Void (ボイド, Boido) is the leader and eldest member of the God Hand. His distinctive appearance features an exposed brain, stitched-shut eyes, and retracted lips. A philosophical being focused on manipulating destiny, he oversees the branding of sacrificial victims for Apostle transformation. Void possesses six-fingered hands and wears a distorted cloak, capable of creating interdimensional portals at will.

He shares a historical connection with the Skull Knight, tied to the fall of Gaiseric's Midland empire. Ancient legends describe a holy man imprisoned in the Tower of Conviction who summoned divine punishment against Gaiseric, though Void's exact role in these events remains undisclosed.

==== Slan ====
Voiced by: Atsuko Tanaka (1997 series and Berserk: Millennium Falcon Hen Seima Senki no Shō), Miyuki Sawashiro (The Golden Age Arc and 2016 series) (Japanese); C.L. Jones (1997 series), Simone Montgomery (The Golden Age Arc), Allegra Clark (2016 series) (English)

Slan (スラン, Suran), the sole female member of the God Hand, manifests as a winged nude woman with vine-like hair. The Skull Knight refers to her as "Whore Princess of the Uterine Sea". She embodies sadomasochistic tendencies, deriving pleasure from cruelty and its psychological impact. Like her fellow God Hand members, she influences humanity through a pagan cult worshiping her as "The Goddess of Blazes".

Slan develops a particular fascination with Guts following Griffith's ascension. During their encounter, she expresses desire to enslave him sexually. After Griffith's Incarnation Ritual, she independently manifests the Qliphoth in a forest, constructing a temporary body from troll entrails to tempt Guts into using the Count's stolen Behelit. The Skull Knight intervenes, enabling Guts to strike her with the Dragonslayer—an act she enjoys before departing with a kiss.

==== Ubik ====
Voiced by: Chafurin (1997 series, Berserk: Millennium Falcon Hen Seima Senki no Shō, and The Golden Age Arc) (Japanese); Christian Collingwood (1997 series), Liam O'Brien (The Golden Age Arc) (English)

Ubik (ユービック, Yūbikku) is a member of the God Hand who manifests as a small floating demon with spectacles and tentacle-like appendages. Characterized by a perpetual sinister grin, he specializes in manipulating potential Apostles during their transformation rituals. Ubik employs psychological persuasion rather than direct falsehoods, conjuring visions of his targets' past or subconscious to induce despair. His method involves distorting reality to convince candidates they must complete their sacrifices, as demonstrated during Griffith's transformation. Ubik's ability to exploit emotional vulnerabilities makes him instrumental in securing pacts with new Apostles.

==== Conrad ====
Voiced by: Toku Nishio (1997 series), Rikiya Koyama (The Golden Age Arc) (Japanese); Sean Schemmel (1997 series and The Golden Age Arc) (English)

Conrad (コンラッド, Konraddo) is a member of the God Hand associated with inevitability and doom. His grotesque form combines a puckered human face with the segmented body of a giant wood louse. Conrad demonstrates his power by summoning the earthen mound that elevates Griffith during the Eclipse. Unlike his fellow God Hand members, Conrad maintains a stoic demeanor while pursuing his singular goal of spreading pestilence. He partially manifests through diseased rats to engineer a Black Plague outbreak, driving survivors toward St. Albion where they become participants in the Incarnation Ritual.

=== The New Band of the Hawk ===
After returning to the physical plane, Griffith establishes the New Band of the Hawk (新生鷹の団, Shinsei Taka no Dan), using both humans and Apostles.

==== Zodd ====
Voiced by: Kenji Utsumi (1997 series, Sword of the Berserk: Guts' Rage, and Berserk: Millennium Falcon Hen Seima Senki no Shō), Kenta Miyake (The Golden Age Arc and 2016 series) (Japanese); David Brimmer (1997 series and The Golden Age Arc), (Note: Credited as Michael Alston Baley in The Golden Age Arc.) Peter Lurie (Sword of the Berserk: Guts' Rage), Imari Williams (2016 series) (English)

Nosferatu Zodd (不死のゾッド, Fushi no Zoddo), known as Zodd the Immortal, is an Apostle who has thrived through three centuries of combat. His human form transforms into a monstrous, Baphomet-like creature with tiger-like features, bat wings, and a tail. He first encounters Guts and Griffith during a siege, sparing them after recognizing Griffith's Crimson Behelit and foreseeing their significance. Zodd develops a fierce rivalry with both the Skull Knight and Guts, eventually gaining respect for the latter—evidenced when he lends Guts his sword during battle. After witnessing Guts survive the Eclipse, Zodd's admiration deepens. He later loses his left horn to Griffith in a dream confrontation prior to the Incarnation Ritual. Following these events, Zodd retrieves Griffith's reborn form and becomes a key member of his new Band of the Hawk, serving as his foremost lieutenant.

==== Grunbeld ====
Voiced by: Tesshō Genda (Berserk: Millennium Falcon Hen Seima Senki no Shō), Kiyoyuki Yanada (2016 series and Berserk and the Band of the Hawk) (Japanese); Paul St. Peter (2016 series) (English)

Grunbeld Ahlkvist (グルンベルド・アールクヴィスト, Gurunberudo Ārukuvisuto) is a red-armored Apostle in the reformed Band of the Hawk, wielding a warhammer and shield with hidden cannon. His backstory in the spin-off novel Berserk: The Flame Dragon Knight, reveals his origin as a warrior from Grant who transformed into an Apostle after being betrayed in battle. Though monstrous, he retains a warrior's code.

In his crystalline dragon form, he possesses corundum-hard armor and breathes fire. After defeating Guts in combat, he is forced to retreat when Flora's spirit interferes. He later rejoins Griffith's forces against the Kushan.

==== Locus ====
Voiced by: Shōgo Nakamura (2016 series) (Japanese); D. C. Douglas (2016 series) (English)

Locus (ロクス, Rokusu), known as the Moonlight Knight, is one of Griffith's generals in the reborn Band of the Hawk. A peerless jouster, he initially refuses to serve any leader until swearing loyalty to Griffith after experiencing a prophetic vision. As an Apostle, he commands the Hawk's demon lancer division and retains more humanity than most of his fellow Apostles, alongside Irvine. His transformed state merges him with his steed, becoming a metallic centaur wielding an elongated double-ended spear.

==== Irvine ====
Irvine (アーヴァイン, Āvain) serves as the premier archer in Griffith's reformed Band of the Hawk. His distinctive featureless eyes and demonic-eyed bow mark his unusual nature. A solitary hunter by preference, he spends leisure time playing lute by campfires. His unmatched archery skills enable simultaneous precise shots with devastating force—arrows frequently decapitate targets.

In Apostle form, Irvine transforms into a wolf-like creature with horned hindquarters, fur-covered body, and werewolf facial features. This form generates arrows from tail hairs and uses horns as a crossbow. The projectiles expand into root-like spikes upon impact, eviscerating targets. He develops a unique bond with Sonia, who rides him during the final confrontation with Ganishka.

==== Rakshas ====
Voiced by: Masashi Nogawa (2016 series) (Japanese); Frank Todaro (2016 series) (English)

Rakshas (ラクシャス, Rakushasu) serves as a shadowy commander in Griffith's reformed Band of the Hawk. A former Bākiraka Clan assassin exiled from the Kushan Empire, his amorphous form remains concealed beneath a black cloak and white three-eyed mask. He employs shadow manipulation and retractable tendrils for lethal attacks. Though responsible for exposing Silat to Ganishka's demonic experiments, his motives remain self-serving.

Rakshas openly admits his allegiance to Griffith stems solely from wanting to preserve the right to kill him personally. He attempts to assassinate Rickert in Falconia, engaging Silat when the latter intervenes. His Apostle form enhances his size and tentacle dexterity while maintaining his shrouded appearance. Fire represents his sole vulnerability, which Rickert exploits during their escape from Falconia.

==== Sonia ====
Voiced by: Yoshino Nanjō (2016 series) (Japanese); Skyler Davenport (2016 series) (English)

Sonia (ソーニャ, Sōnya) is a member of Griffith's reformed Band of the Hawk, distinguished by her unwavering devotion to him. Orphaned during the Kushan invasion, she is rescued by Griffith's forces and develops a childlike infatuation with him. This manifests as jealousy toward Charlotte, Griffith's betrothed. Sonia possesses natural clairvoyant abilities that intensify in Griffith's presence, which she employs to support the Band's military campaigns. Her cheerful demeanor persists despite the supernatural horrors surrounding Griffith's faction. She forms friendships with Schierke, whom she envisions meeting again, and the Apostle Irvine. During battle, her reckless charge inspires Griffith's human followers after Irvine saves her. Following Falconia's establishment, Griffith appoints her as the new Pope within the church hierarchy.

==== Mule Wolflame ====
Voiced by: Mitsuki Saiga (2016 series) (Japanese); Griffin Burns (2016 series) (English)

Mule Wolflame (ミュール・ウォーフレイム, Myūru Ōfureimu) is a young Midland noble who encounters Griffith's new Band of the Hawk after they rescue his soldiers from Kushan forces. Like many who meet Griffith, he becomes instantly devoted to him. Sonia jokingly dubs him the "duck knight", promising promotion to "wild drake" if he defeats Captain Sharkrider. He serves as Sonia's reluctant guardian while performing squire duties for the Band.

Mule develops a friendly rivalry with Isidro in Vritannis, mirroring Guts and Griffith's early relationship. As the new Band's counterpart to Rickert, he remains unaware of Griffith's true nature. Unlike the streetwise Isidro—who sees through Falconia's facade—Mule's noble upbringing leaves him more naive and impressionable.

=== Apostles ===
==== Snake Lord ====
Voiced by: Kan Tokumaru (1997 series) (Japanese); Lex Wutas (1997 series) (English)

The Snake Lord (ヘビ男爵, Hebi Danshaku) is an Apostle inhabiting Koka Castle who demands human prisoners from the local town. His Apostle form is a giant humanoid cobra with his human face embedded in its jaw. When Guts saves Puck from the Snake Lord's men, he spares one to announce his arrival. Captured and whipped by the mayor's forces, Guts escapes with Puck's help and defeats the Apostle. After crippling him, Guts demands God Hand's location, but leaves him to burn when he fails to answer. The 1997 anime adaptation shows Guts taking the Snake Lord's Green Behelit after killing him.

==== The Count ====
The Count appears as an obese nobleman who executes alleged heretics. After finding his wife at a pagan orgy, he massacres the participants and activates his Behelit, sacrificing her to become a slug-like Apostle with his human face embedded in its forehead. During the Eclipse, he uses Pippin's corpse as bait. Guts later encounters him through Vargas, a mutilated physician seeking revenge. After Vargas steals the Behelit and gives it to Guts, the Count executes Vargas but is ultimately beheaded by Guts. Dying, his blood activates the Behelit, transporting them to the God Hand. When offered salvation in exchange for sacrificing his daughter Theresia, he refuses and is dragged to the Abyss by vengeful spirits, including Vargas. The Behelit remains in Guts' possession thereafter.

==== Wyald ====
Voiced by: Kunihiro Kawamoto (Berserk and the Band of the Hawk)

Wyald (ワイアルド, Waiarudo) is the sadistic commander of the Black Dog Knights, Midland's most feared military battalion composed entirely of criminals. In his Apostle form, he transforms into a massive primate-like creature. Charged by the King of Midland with hunting down Griffith and his rescuers from the Band of the Hawk, Wyald engages in brutal pursuit. After suffering severe injuries from Guts, he attempts to convince Griffith to use the Crimson Behelit to summon the God Hand, unaware the king's torturer had already discarded it. The Demon Apostle Zodd ultimately executes Wyald, revealing his true form as a frail old man prior to his transformation. Wyald and the Black Dog Knights do not appear in the 1997 anime television series and the film trilogy adaptations.

==== Rosine ====
Rosine (ロシーヌ, Roshīnu) is an Apostle who sacrifices her parents to transform into a creature resembling an elf, with luna moth wings, antennae, and distinctive head armor. Inspired by the legend of Peekaf, a child who believed himself an elf, she declares herself the Queen of the Elves. She rules Misty Valley with pseudo-Apostle minions disguised as elves that terrorize villages and abduct children. First appearing during the Eclipse, Rosine observes from a distance as other Apostles attack the Band of the Hawk. Rosine battles Guts when he invades her domain with Puck and her childhood friend Jill. She offers to transform Jill, who refuses upon seeing Rosine's cruelty. Guts destroys her cocoons and wounds her in combat. Though Jill tries to protect her, Rosine flees only to comprehend Peekaf's tragic moral before dying from her injuries.

==== The Egg of the Perfect World ====
Voiced by: Hiroyuki Yoshino (2016 series) (Japanese); Derek Stephen Prince (2016 series) (English)

The Egg of the Perfect World (完璧な世界の卵, Kanpeki na Sekai no Tamago) is a nameless, deformed Apostle dwelling beneath the Tower of Conviction. Ostracized by refugees, he digs a pit that becomes a mass grave. Buried under corpses, he activates a Behelit and sacrifices himself to the God Hand, wishing to cleanse the world. Transformed into a sentient Behelit, his sole purpose is enabling Griffith's rebirth through the Incarnation Ceremony. He spawns pseudo-Apostles like Father Mozgus and his disciples. Before the ritual, he briefly reveals himself to a prostitute. Consuming Guts' dying Demon Child out of pity, he later "hatches" Griffith, using the child as a vessel.

==== Emperor Ganishka ====
Voiced by: Tesshō Genda (Berserk and the Band of the Hawk)

Emperor Ganishka (ガニシュカ大帝, Ganishuka Taitei) rules the Kushan Empire as a sorcerer-king who survives familial betrayal to establish a tyrannical regime. After nearly being killed by his son, he becomes an Apostle through Daiba's Behelit, sacrificing his son to gain power over water and air. Defying Griffith's authority, he creates an artificial Behelit to breed monstrous warriors for conquering Midland.

In his final confrontation with Griffith, Ganishka transforms into the colossal deity Shiva before being destroyed. His death triggers the World Transformation, merging physical and astral realms while his petrified corpse forms Falconia's foundation.

== The Royal Court of Midland ==
=== The King of Midland ===
Voiced by: Tamio Ōki (1997 series), Nobuyuki Katsube (The Golden Age Arc) (Japanese); Jeff Swarthout (1997 series), Christopher Corey Smith (The Golden Age Arc, 2016 series) (English)

The King of Midland (ミッドランド国王, Middorando Kokuō) is the aged ruler locked in a century-long war with Tudor. His only solace is his daughter Charlotte, the sole source of warmth in his lonely life. Though initially favoring Griffith for his battlefield victories despite noble opposition, he imprisons and tortures him upon discovering his affair with Charlotte. His desperate attempt to force reconciliation with his daughter hastens his decline. Bedridden in his final years, he pleads to see Charlotte but is refused. As he dies, he hallucinates Griffith coming for her and realizes he had once seen the mercenary as a successor who might have spared him the throne's isolation.

=== Charlotte ===
Voiced by: Yuri Shiratori (1997 series), Aki Toyosaki (The Golden Age Arc) (Japanese); Rachael Lillis (1997 series and The Golden Age Arc I), Gina Bowes (The Golden Age Arc I and II) (English)

Charlotte Beatrix Marie Rhody Wyndham (シャルロット・ベアトリックス・マリー・ルホディ・ウインダム, Sharurotto Beatorikkusu Marī Ruhodi Windamu) is the former princess of Midland who becomes infatuated with Griffith after their first meeting. When he is imprisoned for their forbidden relationship, she aids his escape by supplying vital intelligence. After Midland falls to the Kushan Empire, she is held captive by Ganishka and spends her confinement embroidering Griffith's image. Griffith later rescues her with Zodd's help, taking her to Falconia, where she lives among his reborn Band of the Hawk. She formally reinstates them as Midland's royal army following their triumph at Vritannis. Despite Sonia's mocking nickname, "Queen of the Ducks", Charlotte remains devoted to Griffith.

=== Julius ===
Voiced by: Ryūji Mizuno (1997 series), Rikiya Koyama (The Golden Age Arc) (Japanese); Dick Bunting (1997 series), Jesse Corti (The Golden Age Arc) (English)

Julius (ユリウス, Yuriusu) commands the White Dragon Knights as the king's brother. He opposes Griffith's rising influence due to his common birth, conspiring with Minister Foss to assassinate him during a royal hunt. Their plan fails when the arrow strikes Griffith's Crimson Behelit instead, with the king interpreting it as an attempt on Princess Charlotte's life. Griffith retaliates by dispatching Guts, who kills Julius. During his escape, Guts encounters and reluctantly murders Julius' son Adonis after the boy discovers him.

=== The Queen of Midland ===
Voiced by: Toshiko Sawada (1997 series) (Japanese); Sue Gilad (1997 series) (English)

The Queen of Midland (ミッドランド王妃, Middorando Ōhi) is Charlotte's stepmother. She despises Griffith after he orchestrates the death of her lover Julius and supports Minister Foss' plot to poison him. When Foss betrays the conspiracy by using a non-lethal drug instead, Griffith engineers her demise. As the queen and her co-conspirators celebrate his apparent death in a tower, Foss locks them inside the burning structure. Confronting Griffith through the flames, she protests that a commoner cannot kill royalty, to which he responds that battlefield outcomes disregard lineage. She perishes when flaming debris crushes her.

=== Minister Foss ===
Voiced by: Mahito Tsujimura (1997 series) (Japanese); Greg Miller (1997 series) (English)

Minister Foss (フォス, Fosu) is a skilled political manipulator who conspires against Griffith with both Julius and the Queen. After Julius' assassination, Griffith identifies Foss' involvement through the minister's fearful expression and secures his cooperation by kidnapping his daughter Elise. Foss subsequently assists in orchestrating the Queen's death, after which Griffith releases Elise and declares their conflict resolved. Following the Eclipse, Foss interprets prophetic visions of the White Hawk as signaling Griffith's return. He later appears alongside Laban, analyzing Griffith's impending confrontation with Ganishka.

=== Laban ===
Voiced by: Tōru Ōkawa (1997 series), Hochu Ohtsuka (The Golden Age Arc) (Japanese); Sean Elias-Reyes (1997 series), Marc Thompson (The Golden Age Arc) (English)

Laban (ラバン, Raban) is a royal advisor who supports Griffith's military advancement based on merit. Following the Eclipse, he provides aid to plague victims before rejoining Griffith's campaign against Ganishka. His notable actions include leading the liberation of women imprisoned by the Kushan emperor.

=== Owen ===
Voiced by: Naoki Bandō (1997 series) (Japanese); Jason O'Connell (1997 series) (English)

Owen (オーウェン, Ōwen) is a Midland noble who supports Griffith's rise to power. During the king's final days, he expresses concern for Charlotte's welfare but is refused access to her. At Vritannis, Owen alone identifies Guts as the former leader of the Hawk's Raiders. When Charlotte appoints Griffith as Midland's general and the new Band of the Hawk as its official army, Owen defends this decision by citing Griffith's military achievements against Tudor and Charlotte's understanding of his strategic capabilities.

== Other characters ==
=== Gambino ===
Voiced by: Norio Wakamoto (1997 series), Yasunobu Iwata (The Golden Age Arc) (Japanese); Robert Krakovski (1997 series), Russell Nash (The Golden Age Arc) (English)

Gambino (ガンビーノ, Ganbīno) is Guts' adoptive father and leader of a mercenary band who trains Guts as a soldier. During one of Guts' childhood training sessions, Gambino gives him his first facial scar across the nose in a fit of madness. After losing a leg to cannon fire in battle, rendering him unable to fight, Gambino grows increasingly resentful toward Guts, blaming him for the death of his lover Shisu. In a drunken rage one night, Gambino attempts to murder Guts but is instead killed by his adoptive son. Gambino's memory continues to haunt Guts throughout his early life, particularly before the Eclipse that destroys the original Band of the Hawk.

=== The Skull Knight ===
Voiced by: Tsutomu Isobe (Berserk: Millennium Falcon Hen Seima Senki no Shō), Akio Otsuka (The Golden Age Arc and 2016 series) (Japanese); Jamieson Price (The Golden Age Arc and 2016 series) (English)

The Skull Knight (髑髏の騎士, Dokuro no Kishi) is a mysterious armored warrior who rides a spectral steed. His skeletal armor and noble bearing make him both ominous and heroic. A formidable opponent of the God Hand, he easily defeats Apostles and consumes their Behelits. Though evenly matched against his longtime rival Zodd, he ultimately prevails through superior skill. His signature weapon is a sword that can slice dimensional rifts when charged with Behelits, granting him interdimensional travel.

He has rescued Guts multiple times, referring to him as "Struggler" while offering cryptic guidance about fate. The Skull Knight previously wore the Berserker Armor and maintained ties with the witch Flora. During Griffith's battle with Ganishka, his dimensional attack is redirected to strike the Kushan emperor instead.

It is implied that the Skull Knight was once Gaiseric, a legendary conqueror who unified the continent. According to myth, Gaiseric's empire fell when divine punishment came in the form of angels—likely the God Hand themselves.

=== Silat ===
Voiced by: Yuichi Nakamura (The Golden Age Arc and 2016 series) (Japanese); John White (The Golden Age Arc), Lex Lang (2016 series) (English)

Silat (シラット, Shiratto) is a master Kushan warrior who leads the Bākiraka clan. Specializing in exotic weapons like chakrams, katars, and urumi, his Kalaripayattu-inspired fighting style combines acrobatics with theatrical battle cries. He first encounters Guts during a mercenary tournament, where his defeat leads to a failed assault on the Band of the Hawk. Later serving Emperor Ganishka to restore his clan's honor, Silat abandons this allegiance after witnessing Ganishka's monstrous experiments. He rejects an offer to join Griffith's new Band, instead rescuing Rickert from Falconia. The Bākiraka clan shares his combat techniques, with four elite Tapasa warriors employing a Hung Ga-inspired style using reinforced bone protrusions as weapons.

=== Tudor ===
The Empire of Tudor (チューダー帝国, Chūdā Teikoku) is Midland's primary adversary during the Hundred Year War. The empire establishes its military presence by capturing the strategic Fortress of Doldrey, placing it under Governor Gennon's control. Following the Tudor ruler's death, Griffith capitalizes on the resulting power vacuum to retake Doldrey through superior tactics, forcing Tudor's retreat. The novel Berserk: The Flame Dragon Knight further depicts Tudor as an expansionist power that invades the Grand Duchy of Grant under the pretext of religious conversion while committing numerous atrocities.

==== Adon Coborlwitz ====
Voiced by: Tesshō Genda (1997 series), Rikiya Koyama (The Golden Age Arc) (Japanese); Mike Pollock (1997 series and The Golden Age Arc) (English)

Adon (アドン) commands Tudor's Blue Whale Super Strong Heavy Assault Knights (青鯨超重装猛進撃滅騎士団, Seigei Chōjūsō Mōshin Gekimetsu Kishidan) during the Hundred Year War. A boastful and misogynistic warrior, he frequently references fictional "Coborlwitz family secrets"—exaggerated combat techniques like the 300-year-old fleeing maneuver "Bakuretsu Funsai". His initial confrontation with the Band of the Hawk occurs when he assaults Casca with sexist taunts, resulting in Guts disfiguring his face. Seeking revenge, Adon pursues them with a hundred soldiers, including his brother Samson, only for Guts to slaughter them all and earn the title "Hundred Man Slayer".

In the manga continuity, General Boscogn demotes Adon to Doldrey's defense, while the film adaptation depicts his capture by the Hawks and subsequent death at Casca's hands during their infiltration of Doldrey.

==== Boscogn ====
Voiced by: Ikuya Sawaki (1997 series), Takayuki Sugo (The Golden Age Arc) (Japanese); Richard Springle (1997 series), T. J. Storm (The Golden Age Arc) (English)

Boscogn (ボスコーン, Bosukōn) leads Tudor's elite Holy Purple Rhino Knights (紫犀聖騎士団, Murasaki Sai Seikishidan) during the Hundred Year War. A strict disciplinarian who values honor, he chastises Adon for losing troops to Guts. Though forced to serve under Governor Gennon, he privately condemns Gennon's lecherous behavior and tactical incompetence. A master of the berdiche, his strikes can bisect enemies with single blows. At Doldrey, Gennon's interference thwarts Boscogn's strategy, including plans to eliminate Griffith. In his final duel against Guts, Boscogn breaks his opponent's sword but is ultimately decapitated along with his mount when Guts wields a blade secretly provided by Zodd. This decisive defeat forces Tudor's withdrawal, effectively concluding the war.

==== General Abecassis ====
Abecassis (アベカシス, Abekashisu) serves as the primary antagonist of the spin-off novel Berserk: The Flame Dragon Knight and orchestrates Tudor's conquest of the Grand Duchy of Grant under the guise of spreading the Holy See's faith. Stationed at Fort Chester, he oversees Grunbeld's training and attempts to break his spirit by arranging for him and his comrades to be attacked by a tiger. Years after Grunbeld and his allies escape, Abecassis manipulates the Grantian noble Haakon into surrendering the duchy to Tudor while simultaneously plotting to eliminate Grunbeld and his Flame Dragon Knights. The assassination attempt backfires, however, triggering the events that lead to Grunbeld's transformation into an Apostle. Abecassis ultimately meets an agonizing death.

=== Guts and Casca's Child ===
Also known as the Demon Child (幼魔, Yōma), is a nameless entity who was conceived by Guts and Casca shortly before the Eclipse. Griffith's violation of Casca as Femto corrupts the fetus, causing its premature birth as a deformed, rat-sized creature. The child instinctively follows its parents for two years, displaying protective behavior and supernatural abilities that gradually drain its life force. The Egg of the Perfect World consumes the dying child, transforming it into Griffith's physical vessel.

Despite this transformation, the child's essence endures. It subtly guides Griffith to shield Casca during Guts' clash with Zodd and later resurfaces under the full moon as a raven-haired youth. Known as the Moonlight Child (月下の少年, Gekka no Shōnen), this mysterious figure aids Guts and his companions on their journey to Elfhelm.

=== Jill ===
Jill (ジル, Jiru) is a village girl whose home is plagued by demons from Misty Valley, mistaken by villagers as elves. After Guts and Puck rescue her from a sacrificial ritual, she leads them to her village where they face hostility due to Puck's presence. Jill later identifies the demon leader Rosine as her childhood friend. Rosine offers to transform her into an elf, but Jill refuses, horrified by their brutality. Guts arrives, destroys Rosine's cocoons, and battles her until she is weakened. As Guts moves to deliver the final strike, Jill intervenes to protect Rosine. The arrival of Jill's father and the Holy Iron Chain Knights forces Guts to retreat. Jill later catches up to him, pleading to join his travels, but Guts refuses, insisting she return home for her own safety. Before returning home, she receives a protective bramble from Puck to ward off her abusive father.

=== Mozgus ===
Voiced by: Rikiya Koyama (2016 series) (Japanese); Ray Chase (2016 series) (English)

Mozgus (モズグス, Mozugusu) is a fanatical Holy See inquisitor known for his golem-like appearance. He brutally tortures and executes accused heretics, believing all people are sinners except his devoted followers. During Midland's plague, he investigates pagan activity at St. Albion. When captured Casca is worshipped by pagans, Mozgus condemns her as a witch. After witnessing supernatural phenomena, the Egg of the Perfect World transforms him into a feather-covered Pseudo-Apostle, reinforcing his divine delusion. In his final battle against Guts, Mozgus dies protecting refugees with his flames. His burning corpse continues shielding survivors from the undead until the Incarnation Ritual begins, leaving Jerome to remark he resembled a guardian angel in death.

=== Luca ===
Voiced by: Miyuki Sawashiro (2016 series) (Japanese); Wendee Lee (2016 series) (English)

Luca (ルカ, Ruka) leads a group of prostitutes in Albion during the Holy See's witch hunts. Initially appearing cynical when defending Casca's innocence to officials, she demonstrates genuine compassion by sheltering the mute former commander under the alias Elaine. Luca maintains order among her girls through equitable treatment, dividing a gifted pearl necklace equally among them. She protects her charges through various means, including disguising Casca's identity and physically disciplining the wayward Nina. When Albion descends into chaos, Luca rescues Nina from Mozgus' torture chamber with the Skull Knight's assistance and later survives the city's destruction by hiding in a well. Following these events, she establishes an inn in Falconia.

=== Flora ===
Voiced by: Sumi Shimamoto (Berserk: Millennium Falcon Hen Seima Senki no Shō, 2016 series, and Berserk and the Band of the Hawk) (Japanese); Philece Sampler (2016 series) (English)

Flora (フローラ, Furōra) is a powerful witch and mentor to Schierke, teaching her magic and the use of Od. A longtime ally of the Skull Knight, she implies familiarity with his past human self. Once a wandering healer, she withdraws to the forests near Enoch village after facing persecution from the Holy See. When Guts and his companions pass through, Flora aids them against a troll threat, granting enchanted items and protective tattoos to mitigate the Brand of Sacrifice's effects. Later, Griffith's Apostles attack her home. As she dies, her spirit manipulates the flames to shield Guts' group, allowing their escape.

=== Federico de Vandimion ===
Federico de Vandimion (フェデリコ・ド・ヴァンディミオン, Federiko de Vandimion) leads the influential Vandimion noble family. Father to Farnese, Serpico, and three other children, he maintains emotional distance from his family while managing the family fortune. Though appearing neglectful, he secretly fears Farnese's unstable behavior, as revealed by his wife. His sole act of paternal responsibility involves granting Serpico noble status in exchange for silence about their biological relationship. When Kushan forces attack a noble gathering, Farnese requests Guts to protect her family despite their estrangement.

=== Captain Bonebeard ===
Voiced by: Riki Kagami (2016 series) (Japanese); Frank Todaro (2016 series) (English)

Captain Bonebeard (髭骸骨, Hige Gaikotsu) commands the pirate vessel Captain Sharkrider, distinguished by its shark-riding skeletal figurehead. Formerly a trader of Kushan children, he abandons slaving after being defeated by Schierke's group at the docks. His later assault on Roderick's warship ends in catastrophic failure, nearly destroying his own vessel. Following the World Transformation, Bonebeard and his crew merge with the Sea God, becoming its primary enforcers until Guts destroys the creature. Despite his menacing appearance, Bonebeard ultimately proves cowardly, reduced to a broken shell of his former self after losing both his criminal livelihood and nautical prowess.

=== Daiba ===
Daiba (ダイバ) serves as Ganishka's chief sorcerer and advisor, advocating for magical rule over the Kushan Empire. Originally an ascetic, he provides Ganishka with the Behelit that transforms him into an Apostle and later crafts an artificial Behelit to create their monstrous army. Daiba confronts Guts' party with powerful weather magic and summoned sea creatures, but falls to the combined efforts of Guts and Schierke.

After Ganishka's transformation and subsequent death during the World Transformation, Daiba retreats to Falconia, working discreetly as a stable hand. He later rescues Erica from Rakshas and aids Rickert and Silat in their escape from the city.

== Video game characters ==
=== Rita ===
Voiced by: Yuri Shiratori (Japanese); Paula Tiso (English)

Rita (リタ) appears in Sword of the Berserk: Guts' Rage. She is a traveling performer renowned for her knife-throwing and juggling skills. After her accomplice, Job, was infected by the Mandragora, her career came to an abrupt end when Guts killed him. Though initially reluctant, she eventually aids Guts throughout the story.

=== Balzac ===
Voiced by: Kenji Utsumi (Japanese); Earl Boen (English)

Balzac (バルザック, Baruzakku) appears in Sword of the Berserk: Guts' Rage. He begins as a compassionate ruler, but his desperate attempts to heal his wife Annette using forbidden Mandragoran research twist him into a merciless despot. When Guts arrives, Balzac sees an opportunity—he schemes to obtain the legendary Mandragora Heart, believing it can restore Annette's shattered mind. However, Balzac himself mutates into a Mandragoran. As he lies dying, the sudden appearance of a Behelit (delivered unwittingly by Rita) offers one last chance—at the ultimate price. In his final monstrous act, he sacrifices Annette to become a grotesque Apostle, only to meet swift annihilation at Guts' blade.

=== Eriza ===
Voiced by: Sumi Shimamoto (Japanese); B. J. Ward (English)

Eriza (エリザ) appears in Sword of the Berserk: Guts' Rage. A nun who joins the Mandragoran cult without losing her free will, she turns to the cult after Niko, a simple-minded boy from her cathedral, dies. When a Mandragora plant sprouts from his corpse, she protects it as it infests her village. Balzac takes a piece of the Mandragora's Heart for study and hires Guts to retrieve the rest. Eriza begs Guts to leave but fights him when he severs the heart from the tree. Refusing to yield Niko's remains, she flees, only to find Balzac's men massacring the villagers. Cornered, she retreats into her burning church and kills herself. As she dies, she drops a pendant holding a Behelit from Niko's body, which Balzac later obtains.

=== Charles ===
Voiced by: Megumi Toyoguchi

Charles (シャルル, Sharuru) appears in Berserk: Millennium Falcon Hen Seima Senki no Shō. A noble child orphaned by a fire that destroyed his home, he becomes an Apostle with illusion-casting powers after sacrificing his sister. He suppresses her death, instead creating a phantom of her. Isolated in a reconstructed version of his manor, he remains there until Guts arrives. Charles attacks Guts by summoning illusions of the dead Band of the Hawk, but Guts ultimately kills him.
