= Samurai Crusader =

Japanese manga series by Oji Hiroi and Ryoichi Ikegami

- First tankōbon volume cover

王立院雲丸の生涯 (Ōritsuin Kumomaru no Shōgai)
- Genre: Adventure, historical
- Manga
- Written by: Oji Hiroi
- Illustrated by: Ryoichi Ikegami
- Published by: Shogakukan
- English publisher: NA: Viz Media
- Imprint: Shōnen Sunday Comics Special
- Magazine: Weekly Shōnen Sunday
- English magazine: NA: Manga Vizion
- Original run: July 3, 1991 – March 11, 1992
- Volumes: 3
- icon

Samurai Crusader: The Kumomaru Chronicles (Japanese: 王立院雲丸の生涯, Hepburn: Ōritsuin Kumomaru no Shōgai) is a Japanese manga series written by Oji Hiroi and illustrated by Ryoichi Ikegami. It was serialized in Shogakukan's shōnen manga magazine Weekly Shōnen Sunday from July 1991 to March 1992, with its chapters collected in three tankōbon volumes. In North America, the manga was licensed by Viz Media, which serialized it in their Manga Vizion magazine in 1995.

== Plot ==
The story follows Kumomaru, a Japanese samurai who travels to Europe during the 1930s and becomes embroiled in a plot to steal the legendary Japanese sword Kusanagi. While in Europe, Kumomaru befriends Ernest Hemingway and Pablo Picasso and attempts to stop Major General Kamishima and his Nazi allies from conquering China.

== Publication ==
Samurai Crusader is written by Oji Hiroi and illustrated by Ryoichi Ikegami. It was serialized in Shogakukan's shōnen manga magazine Weekly Shōnen Sunday from July 3, 1991, to March 11, 1992. Shogakukan collected its chapters in three tankōbon volumes, released between February and May 1992. Media Factory re-released the manga in two bunkoban volumes on April 5 and May 2, 2003. Media Factory released a complete edition on December 22, 2006.

In North America, the series was licensed by Viz Media, which serialized it in their magazine Manga Vizion in 1995. Viz Media published the three volumes of the series between August 5, 1996, and December 6, 1997.

=== Volumes ===
No.	Original release date	Original ISBN	English release date	English ISBN
1	February 1992	978-4-09-123701-9	August 5, 1996	978-1-56931-130-1
2	April 1992	978-4-09-123702-6	April 5, 1997	978-1-56931-164-6
3	May 1992	978-4-09-123703-3	December 6, 1997	978-1-56931-236-0

== Reception ==
In Manga: The Complete Guide, Jason Thompson praised the series as a historical adventure blending Indiana Jones-style action with 1980s Hong Kong cinema. He highlighted Ryoichi Ikegami's detailed artwork and restrained tone compared to his more graphic works like Crying Freeman and Offered. Katherine Dacey (The Manga Critic) commended Ikegami's intricate backgrounds and character designs, but criticized the stiff dialogue. She noted the series retained the action and drama of Crying Freeman and Wounded Man without their explicit content.
