= Duranki (manga) =

Japanese manga series

- Volume cover

ドゥルアンキ (Duruanki)
- Genre: Adventure; Fantasy
- Manga
- Written by: Kentaro Miura
- Illustrated by: Studio Gaga (Note: Consisting of members Yoshimitsu Kurosaki, Akio Miyaji, Nobuchika Hirai, Arihide Nagashima, Hideki Sugimoto, and Shigeru Kinoshita.)
- Published by: Hakusensha
- English publisher: NA: Dark Horse Comics
- Imprint: Young Animal Comics
- Magazine: Young Animal Zero
- Original run: September 9, 2019 – May 9, 2020
- Volumes: 1
- icon

Duranki (Japanese: ドゥルアンキ, Hepburn: Duruanki) is a Japanese manga series written and produced by Kentaro Miura and illustrated by his personal manga studio, Studio Gaga. Inspired by the aesthetic of ancient Greek and Mesopotamian myths, the story follows an androgynous protagonist named Usumgal, who lives in a mythological world. It was serialized in Hakusensha's seinen manga magazine Young Animal Zero from September 2019 to May 2020. The publisher decided to finish the series following Miura's death in May 2021. Its chapters were collected in a single volume, released in December 2021.

== Plot ==
Created from the blood of two gods at the Fountain of Karia, the unique child, Usumgal, was neither god nor human, and neither male nor female. Raised by an elderly couple on Mount Nisir, Usumgal grew into a clever youth, demonstrating great ingenuity by inventing an irrigation system and a powerful stone launcher. This weapon impressed Kirta, the prince of the hidden Hurrian village of Tase, leading to a friendship between the two and the beginning of a joint companionship.

== Production ==
Hakusensha announced Duranki in 2019, stating the manga would launch in the inaugural issue of Young Animal Zero, with two chapters, totaling 64 pages.

The announcement received negative attention from fans of Miura's Berserk series, worrying that this new manga would only distract and further delay Berserk. In response, Miura gave an interview where he clarified that his involvement in Duranki would be relatively minimal and not impede the progress of Berserk. Based on suggestions from Hakusensha, Miura served as the "director" of the project, drawing the storyboards and rough copies for each installment while his assistants at Studio Gaga do the majority of the work, including the inking. Based on the success of strong female characters in works like Frozen and Mad Max: Fury Road, Miura saw an androgynous lead character as the next step and decided to "throw a stone at it" with this story.

Miura died of aortic dissection on May 6, 2021. In September of the same year, Hakusensha announced that the manga had ended, after consideration and discussions between the editors and Studio Gaga.

== Publication ==
Duranki debuted in the inaugural issue of Hakusensha's Young Animal Zero, with its first two chapters published on September 9, 2019. Its third chapter was published on November 9, 2019; the fourth chapter was published on January 9, 2020; the fifth chapter was published on March 9, 2020; the sixth and last chapter was published on May 9, 2020. Miura died on May 6, 2021, and the publisher announced in September of the same year that they decided to finish the series. The posthumous collected volume, which included unpublished design materials, was released on December 24, 2021.

In February 2025, Dark Horse Comics that it had licensed the manga for English release in North America, and the collected volume was released on September 23, 2025.

=== Chapters ===
No.	Original release date	Original ISBN	English release date	English ISBN
1	December 24, 2021	978-4-592-16308-4	September 23, 2025	978-1-5067-4638-8
1. "Usumgal of Mount Nisir" (ニシル山のウスムガル, Nishiru Yama no Usumugaru); 2. "Forest Encounter" (出会いの森, Deai no Mori); 3. "The Hot Mud Trap" (熱泥の罠, Netsu Doro no Wana); 4. "Red Dolphins" (赤い海豚, Akai Iruka); 5. "The Hurrian People" (フルリの民, Fururi no Tami); 6. "Beast of Legend" (魔獣, Majū)
