= Kentaro Miura =

Japanese manga artist (1966–2021)

- 三浦 建太郎
- Miura in 2020
- Born: July 11, 1966; Chiba, Chiba Prefecture, Japan
- Died: May 6, 2021 (aged 54); Japan
- Occupation: Manga artist
- Writing career
- Years active: 1985–2021
- Genre: Dark fantasy
- Notable work: Berserk
- Notable awards: Shōnen Magazine Newcomer Manga Award (1985); Tezuka Osamu Cultural Prize (2002)

Kentaro Miura (Japanese: 三浦 建太郎, Hepburn: Miura Kentarō; July 11, 1966 – May 6, 2021) was a Japanese manga artist. He was best known for his dark fantasy series Berserk, which began serialization in 1989. By 2023, Berserk had over 60 million copies in circulation, making it one of the best-selling manga series of all time. In 2002, Miura received the Award for Excellence at the sixth Tezuka Osamu Cultural Prize.

== Early life and education ==
Miura was born on July 11, 1966, in Chiba, Chiba Prefecture, Japan. In 1976, at the age of 10, he created his first manga, entitled Miuranger, which was published for his classmates in a school publication; the series ended up spanning 40 volumes. In 1977, Miura created his second manga, Ken e no Michi (剣への道; "The Way to the Sword"), in which he used India ink for the first time. When he was in middle school in 1979, his drawing techniques improved greatly as he started using professional drawing techniques.

While in high school in 1982, Miura enrolled in an artistic curriculum, where he and his classmates started publishing their works in school booklets. There, he befriended his later fellow manga artist Kouji Mori. They both co-authored a science fiction doujinshi which was sent to Weekly Shōnen Sunday, but was shot down in the last round of selections. At age 18, Miura briefly worked as an assistant to George Morikawa, of Hajime no Ippo fame. Morikawa quickly acknowledged Miura's high artistic level and dismissed him, saying there was nothing he could teach that Miura did not already know. By then, Miura had a dark warrior with a gigantic sword already illustrated in his portfolio.

== Career ==
In 1985, Miura applied for entrance to the art college of Nihon University. He submitted a short project, Futatabi (再び; "Once More"), for examination and was granted admission. The project later earned him the 34th Newcomer Manga Award from Weekly Shōnen Magazine. Miura's next work, NOA, was published in Fresh Magazine in the same year, but it was not successful. In 1988, while working for Buronson on a project titled King of Wolves (王狼, Ōrō), Miura published a prototype of Berserk in Hakusensha's Monthly ComiComi; the 48-page prototype placed second in ComiComi's seventh Manga School competition. The full serialization of Berserk, which would become Miura's most famous and successful work, began in Hakusensha's Monthly Animal House in 1989. In 1990, a sequel to King of Wolves, entitled Ōrō Den (王狼伝; "Legend of the King of Wolves"), was published in the same magazine. In 1992, Monthly Animal House was renamed Young Animal, where Berserk continued serialization. In the same year, Miura collaborated with Buronson on the manga Japan, which was also published in Young Animal.

In 1997, Miura supervised the production of a 25-episode anime adaptation of Berserk produced by OLM, Inc., which aired in the same year on NTV. He also supervised the 1999 Dreamcast video game Sword of the Berserk: Guts' Rage. In 2002, Miura received the Award for Excellence at the sixth Tezuka Osamu Cultural Prizes for Berserk. Starting in 2006, Berserk went on frequent and often extended hiatuses, and alternated between monthly and irregular serialization. By 2023, Berserk was collected into 42 tankōbon volumes in Japan, and by September 2023, it had over 60 million copies in circulation worldwide, including digital versions. The series also spawned a host of merchandise, both official and fan-made, ranging from statues, action figures to key rings, video games, and a trading card game. Various art books and supplemental materials by Miura based on Berserk were also released.

In 2013, Miura released the short standalone manga Giganto Maxia, published in English-speaking territories by Dark Horse in 2016. Duranki, a short manga produced by Miura's personal manga studio Studio Gaga, was serialized in Young Animal Zero in 2019.

== Influences ==
Miura stated that the work that had the biggest impact on his own was Buronson and Tetsuo Hara's manga Fist of the North Star (1983 debut). Miura also cited influences from Go Nagai's Violence Jack (1973 debut), the Japanese fantasy novel series Guin Saga (1979 debut), Paul Verhoeven films, the Hellraiser series (1987 debut), shōjo manga, Disney films, and the works of Hieronymous Bosch, M. C. Escher, Gustave Doré, and Pieter Bruegel. He also commented that he started by imitating manga from publisher Gakken to develop his art style, and other authors and artists who influenced him include Katsuhiro Otomo, Shinji Mizushima, Rei Hijiri, Leiji Matsumoto, Buichi Terasawa, Noriyoshi Ohrai, and Naoyuki Kato. Miura also cited anatomy books by Thomas R. Gest as a reference for accurately depicting the human form.

== Death ==
On May 6, 2021, Miura died due to an acute aortic dissection, at the age of 54. His death was publicly announced on May 20, 2021. A private ceremony was held by his family.

Various manga artists offered condolences, including Kouji Mori, Miura's high school friend, and George Morikawa, who shared a story of their friendship. People who worked on the Berserk anime adaptations also paid tribute to Miura, including Susumu Hirasawa, composer for the 1997 series; Nobutoshi Canna and Yūko Miyamura, who voiced Guts and Casca, respectively, in the 1997 series; Hiroaki Iwanaga, Guts' voice actor since the 2012–13 film trilogy; and singer Yoshino Nanjō, who voiced Sonia and performed the ending theme for the 2016 series' second season with Nagi Yanagi.

== Legacy ==
Established as one of the best-selling manga of all time, Miura's series Berserk impacted the manga medium and beyond, with journalist Jade King stating: "[It] is difficult to overstate the tremendous impact his work has had on the world of games, manga, film, anime, and even literature." The image of Guts and his massive sword is attributed to inspiring characters like Cloud Strife of Final Fantasy VII and Dante from the Devil May Cry series, with the overall aesthetic of Berserk inspiring the monsters and world of the Dark Souls series. Video game director Hideaki Itsuno and producer Hiroyuki Kobayashi are fans of Berserk, and the role-playing hack and slash game Dragon's Dogma includes armor based on Guts and Griffith's. During a GDC talk in 2019, Itsuno stated that the tone and style of Devil May Cry 5 was inspired from Berserk.

Many authors have cited Miura and Berserk as influences, including Blue Exorcist author Kazue Kato, Baccano! and Durarara!! author Ryōgo Narita, Black Butler author Yana Toboso, Black Clover author Yūki Tabata, and Attack on Titan author Hajime Isayama, who called it "tremendous, just magnificent ... I got the impression that it was very well organized like a movie". Yoko Taro stated that the protagonist of Drakengard, Caim, was inspired by Berserk's protagonist Guts.

A "memorial" Young Animal issue dedicated to Miura was released on September 10, 2021. Besides the inclusion of the posthumous chapter 364 of Berserk, the issue featured a special "Messages to Kentarou Miura" booklet and a poster of "famous scenes" from the manga. In the issue, manga artist Kouji Mori, Miura's long-time friend, published a one-shot titled "Mori-chan Ken-chan", which tells the story of Mori's friendship with Miura.

On June 7, 2022, Hakusensha and Kouji Mori announced that Berserk would continue publication, using plans and thoughts that were relayed to Mori by Miura himself, as well as memoranda and character designs that Miura left behind. As the only person who knows the ending Miura intended, Mori agreed to continue the series and promised: "I will only write the episodes that Miura talked to me about. I will not flesh it out. I will not write episodes that I don't remember clearly. I will only write the lines and stories that Miura described to me." The credits appear as "original work by Kentaro Miura, art by Studio Gaga, supervised by Kouji Mori".

== Works ==
- Futatabi (再び; "Once More") (1985)—One-shot. Published in Kodansha's Weekly Shōnen Magazine.
- NOA (1985)—One-shot. Published in Kodansha's Fresh Magazine.
- Berserk: The Prototype (ベルセルク, Beruseruku) (1988)—One-shot. Published in Hakusensha's Monthly ComiComi.
- King of Wolves (王狼, Ōrō) (1989)—Written by Buronson, illustrated by Miura. Serialized in Hakusensha's Monthly Animal House.
- Berserk (ベルセルク, Beruseruku) (1989–2021)—Serialized in Hakusensha's Monthly Animal House (1989–1992) and Young Animal (1992–2021).
- Ōrō Den (王狼伝) (1990)—Written by Buronson, illustrated by Miura. Serialized in Hakusensha's Monthly Animal House.
- Japan (ジャパン) (1992)—Written by Buronson, illustrated by Miura. Serialized in Hakusensha's Young Animal.
- Giganto Maxia (ギガントマキア, Gigantomakia) (2013–2014)—Serialized in Hakusensha's Young Animal.
- Duranki (ドゥルアンキ) (2019–2020)—Serialized in Hakusensha's Young Animal Zero.
