= King of Wolves =

Japanese manga series by Kentaro Miura

- King of Wolves cover

王狼 (Ōrō)
- Genre: Adventure; Historical
- Manga
- Written by: Buronson
- Illustrated by: Kentaro Miura
- Published by: Hakusensha
- English publisher: NA: Dark Horse Comics
- Imprint: Jets Comics
- Magazine: Monthly Animal House
- Original run: May 1989 – July 1989
- Volumes: 1
- Manga

Ōrō Den
- Written by: Buronson
- Illustrated by: Kentaro Miura
- Published by: Hakusensha
- Imprint: Jets Comics
- Magazine: Monthly Animal House
- Original run: February 1990 – June 1990
- Volumes: 1
- icon

King of Wolves (Japanese: 王狼, Hepburn: Ōrō) is a Japanese manga series written by Buronson and illustrated by Kentaro Miura. It was serialized in Hakusensha's Monthly Animal House in 1989, with its chapters collected in a single tankōbon volume. A sequel, titled Ōrō Den, was serialized from 1989 to 1990, with its chapters also collected in a single tankōbon volume.

== Publication ==
King of Wolves is written by Buronson and illustrated by Kentaro Miura. It was serialized in Hakusensha's Monthly Animal House from the May to July 1989 issues. Its chapters were collected in a single tankōbon volume, released on December 18, 1989. A sequel, titled Ōrō Den (王狼伝; "Legend of King of Wolves"), was serialized in Monthly Animal House from the February 1990 to the June 1990 issues. Its chapters were collected in a single tankōbon, released on August 24, 1990. A bunkoban volume, which includes both series, was published on March 13, 1998. Young Animal Zero started republishing the series on September 13, 2021.

In North America, King of Wolves was licensed for English release by Dark Horse Comics. The volume was published on May 25, 2005.

== Reception ==
In Manga: The Complete Guide, author Jason Thompson gave the series 1½ out of four stars and wrote: "The only mildly amusing premise is basically an excuse for Miura to draw macho sword fights and hordes of cavalry. Miura's crosshatched art is not at the level of Berserk or even Japan, and the fight scenes are disappointing".
