= Ash Crow =

2016 album by Susumu Hirasawa

Soundtrack album / Compilation album / Remix album by Susumu Hirasawa
- Released: September 14, 2016
- Recorded: 1999–2016
- Studio: Studio WIRESELF, Tsukuba, Ibaraki
- Genre: Film score; Ambient; Electronica; Orchestral; Technopop
- Length: 53:50
- Language: Japanese, Hirasawan
- Label: Chaos Union, TESLAKITE CHTE-0079
- Producer: Susumu Hirasawa

Susumu Hirasawa compilation chronology
Symphonic Code (2014)	Ash Crow (2016)

Ash Crow - Susumu Hirasawa Soundtracks for BERSERK (平沢進 ベルセルク サウンドトラック集, Hirasawa Susumu Beruseruku Saundotorakku Shū) is an album by Susumu Hirasawa.

== Overview ==
Ash Crow contains a series of compositions written by Susumu Hirasawa for adaptations of the manga Berserk. Tied to the 2016 TV adaptation, the album includes both insert songs made for it, with the title track being a previously unannounced alternative arrangement. Besides those, the album contains both original versions of various tracks and re-recordings with new arrangements, as well as some instrumental mixes of recent songs.

It contains both tracks from the 2012 "Aria" single. The presence of "Sign" marks the second time the track has appeared in a compilation, after 2007's Music for Movies.

"Aria", "Sign" and "Sign-3" have lyrics written in "Hirasawan" (ヒラサワ語, Hirasawa-go), a language Hirasawa created by mixing together elements of Thai, German and Latin.

== Track listing ==
All tracks are written by Susumu Hirasawa. All tracks marked with * are previously unreleased on any standalone music format

No.	Title	Originally from	Length
1.	"Ashes" (灰よ Hai yo) (*)	Berserk, 2016	4:17
2.	"BERSERK-Forces 2016" (*)	Sword-Wind Chronicle, 1997	4:19
3.	"Aria"	Golden Age Arc, 2012	4:45
4.	"FORCES II"	Chapter of the Flowers of Oblivion/Guts' Rage, 1999	3:55
5.	"ZODDO II" (instrumental)	Chapter of the Flowers of Oblivion/Guts' Rage	3:14
6.	"Horde of Thistledown" (冠毛種子の大群 Kanmō Shushi no Taigun) (Large Chamber ver.) (*)	The Secret of The Flowers of Phenomenon, 2012	4:37
7.	"INDRA 2016" (*)	Chapter of the Flowers of Oblivion/Guts' Rage	5:06
8.	"Ash Crow" (*)	Berserk	5:28
9.	"Sign"	Chapter of the Holy Demon War, 2004	4:10
10.	"Sign-3" (*)	Chapter of the Holy Demon War	3:50
11.	"Aria" (Karaoke)	Golden Age Arc	4:45
12.	"Ashes" (灰よ Hai yo) (Karaoke) (*)	Berserk	4:17
13.	"Ash Crow" (Karaoke) (*)	Berserk	5:28

Although not specifically written for any Berserk project, "Horde of Thistledown" was used as the ending theme of The Fallen Hawk (堕ちた鷹, Ochita Taka), a 2013 TV special narrated by Skull Knight voice actor Akio Ōtsuka that summarized the events of the first two Golden Age Arc movies.

== Personnel ==
- Susumu Hirasawa – Vocals, Guitar, Keyboards, Personal computer, Digital audio workstation, Synthesizers, Sampler, Sequencer, Programming, Production
- Masanori Chinzei – Recording, Mixing, Mastering
- Toshifumi Nakai – Design
- Syotaro Takami – Translation
- MARINE ENTERTAINMENT – Licensor (4–5)
- WAVEMASTER Inc. – Licensor (9)

== Chart performance ==
Chart	Peak position
Oricon Albums Chart	16
Oricon Dance & Soul Albums Chart	1
amazon.co.jp dance/electronica sales ranking	1
