= Buronson =

Japanese manga writer (born 1947)

Yoshiyuki Okamura
- Born: June 16, 1947 (age 79); Saku, Nagano, Japan
- Other names: Buronson; Sho Fumimura
- Occupation: Manga writer
- Years active: 1972–present
- Known for: Doberman Deka; Fist of the North Star; Sanctuary; Heat

Yoshiyuki Okamura (Japanese: 岡村 善行, Hepburn: Okamura Yoshiyuki; born June 16, 1947), known by the pen names Buronson (武論尊) and Sho Fumimura (史村 翔, Fumimura Shō), is a Japanese manga writer. Making his debut in 1972, he first found success with the hardboiled detective manga series Doberman Deka (1975–1979) alongside illustrator Shinji Hiramatsu. He is best-known for creating the post-apocalyptic martial arts series Fist of the North Star (1983–1988) with artist Tetsuo Hara, which is one of the best-selling manga in history with over 100 million copies in circulation. He has since worked with Ryoichi Ikegami on several series, including Heat (1998–2004), which won the 2002 Shogakukan Manga Award for general manga. Buronson received a Special Award at the 2021 Saito Takao Awards for his continued contributions to manga, including his training of younger artists.

== Early life and career ==
Buronson was born on June 16, 1947, in Saku, Nagano. He was the youngest of six children in a farming family. In 2017, he established a scholarship program in his hometown. The following year he started a manga school, Buronson 100-Hour Manga Academy (武論尊100時間漫画塾), at the Sakudaira Community Center in Saku on April 15. Tuition is free, and students attend 20 lectures from professional writers, artists and editors throughout the year for a total of 100 hours.

After leaving junior high school, Buronson entered the Japan Air Self-Defense Force to escape poverty. There he became friends with Hiroshi Motomiya. He graduated from there in 1967 and served as an Air Force radar mechanic. In 1970 he left the Self-Defense Force and was hired by Motomiya as a manga assistant in 1971. He made his manga writing debut in Weekly Shōnen Jump in 1972 with the one-shot Gorō-kun Tōjō, illustrated by Yō Hasebe. He was credited by the pen name Buronson, a nickname given to him by colleagues at Motomiya's studio after they all saw the film Adieu l'ami and felt he was similar to its actor Charles Bronson. He began his first serial, Crime Sweeper with Gorō Sakai in 1973. Its title was later changed to Pink! Punch! Miyabi.

When he wrote for Kodansha for the first time, he used the pen name Sho Fumimura. It was coined by rearranging the letters of his real name when written in English to "Syo Shimura", then writing it in Japanese and changing some characters. He explained that he generally uses Buronson for action series and Sho Fumimura for comedy and other genres, although there are exceptions to both.

In 1975, Buronson began his first hit in Weekly Shōnen Jump, Doberman Deka drawn by Shinji Hiramatsu. It ran until 1979 and was adapted into two live-action films and a TV show. Shortly after beginning Doberman Deka, Fumimura worked for Futabasha for the first and only time with Hakkyū Suikoden Hoero Ryū, drawn by Mitsuru Hiruta. Also as Fumimura, he started the baseball manga Daiki no Mound for Weekly Shōnen Magazine in 1977 with Kenji Iwasaki. When he also began the Self-Defense Force manga Phantom Burai in Shōnen Sunday Zōkan in 1978 with Kaoru Shintani, he was writing three series simultaneously for three different publishers.

In 1980, he began Oh! Takarazuka with Shinji Ono for the launch of the seinen magazine Young Magazine. The following year he started Rettō 198X with Hajime Oki in the same magazine and serialized both at the same time. Also in 1981, Buronson began his first and only shōjo manga, Hold Up! in Margaret with Hikaru Yuzuki. He worked with Yuzuki again on Maji da yo!! (1987–1988) for Monthly Shōnen Jump.

Buronson's greatest success, Fist of the North Star drawn by Tetsuo Hara, made its debut in Weekly Shōnen Jump in 1983. Ending in 1988, it spawned a massive franchise and went on to become one of the best-selling manga in history with over 100 million copies in circulation. From 2001–2010, Hara created a seinen prequel in Weekly Comic Bunch, Fist of the Blue Sky, that Buronson supervised and gave advice on.

In 1989, Buronson worked with Kentaro Miura on King of Wolves for Hakusensha. They began a sequel entitled Orō Den in 1990, before working together again on Japan in 1992. From 1995 to 1997, Fumimura worked for Enix on the series Tenkū Ninden Battle Voyager with Satoru Yuiga.

Although he first worked with Ryoichi Ikegami in 1979 for the one-shot The Scar, the two did not work again until Sanctuary combined politics and yakuza in 1990. When the successful series ended in 1995, they began Odyssey. Although that ended rather quickly after only a year, the team created Strain (1996–1998) and then Heat (1998–2004) in succession. Heat earned them the 2002 Shogakukan Manga Award for general manga. At Ikegami's request, the author used Sho Fumimura for Sanctuary and Odyssey, and Buronson for Strain and Heat.

About five months after Heat ended, Buronson and Ikegami began their fifth series together, Lord (2004–2011). In 2010, Buronson teamed up with Daichi Matsuse for the manga Full Swing in Monthly Shonen Sunday. He and Ikegami then wrote a sequel to Lord, Soul Lord 2 (2011–2013), before creating Rokumonsen Rock (2013–2015). As Fumimura, the author worked with Yuka Nagate on Silencer (2012–2014) about a hitwoman, and with Ikegami on Begin (2016–2020). Buronson and Shiro Yoshida launched the series Too Beat in Big Comic Zōkan on May 17, 2021.

== Works ==
=== As Buronson ===
- Gorō-kun Tōjō (五郎君登場; 1972, art by Yō Hasebe)
- Crime Sweeper (クライムスイーパー; 1973, art by Gorō Sakai)
- Pink! Punch! Miyabi (ピンク!パンチ!雅; 1974, art by Gorō Sakai)
- Doberman Deka (1975–1979, 18 volumes, art by Shinji Hiramatsu)
- Shadow Wings (影の戦闘隊, Kage no Sentō-tai; 1978–1980, 6 volumes, art by Ippei Minami)
- Hold Up! (ホールドアップ!; 1981–1982, 4 volumes, art by Hikaru Yuzuki)
- Fist of the North Star (1983–1988, 27 volumes, art by Tetsuo Hara)
- Mammoth (マンモス; 1984–1988, 9 volumes, art by Takaki Konari)
- Maji da yo!! (まじだよ!!; 1987–1988, art by Hikaru Yuzuki)
- King of Wolves (王狼, Orō; 1989, 1 volume, art by Kentaro Miura)
- Orō Den (王狼伝; 1990, 1 volume, art by Kentaro Miura)
- Japan (1992, 1 volume, art by Kentaro Miura)
- Mushimushi Korokoro (むしむしころころ; 1993–1996, 11 volumes, art by Tsuyoshi Adachi)
- Strain (1996–1998, 5 volumes, art by Ryoichi Ikegami)
- Chase (チェイス-追跡-; 1997, art by Tetsuo Hara)
- Heat (1998–2004, 17 volumes, art by Ryoichi Ikegami)
- Go For Break (GO FOR ぶれいく; 2000, 3 volumes, art by Tsuyoshi Adachi)
- Rising Sun (ライジング・サン; 2001, 3 volumes, art by Tokihiko Matsuura)
- Fist of the Blue Sky (2001–2010, 22 volumes, advisor only, story and art by Tetsuo Hara)
- White Summer (白い夏; 2002, art by Mitsuru Adachi)
- G -Gokudo Girl- (2002–2004, 5 volumes, art by Hidenori Hara)
- Lord (2004–2011, 22 volumes, art by Ryoichi Ikegami)
- Dog Law (2008–2009, art by Atsushi Kamijo)
- Full Swing (2010–2012, art by Daichi Matsuse)
- Soul Lord 2 (SOUL 覇 第2章; 2011–2013, 3 volumes, art by Ryoichi Ikegami)
- Shin Doberman Deka (2012–2013, 2 volumes, art by Shinji Hiramatsu)
- Hokuto no Ken: Last Piece (北斗の拳 −LAST PIECE−; 2013, art by Tetsuo Hara)
- Rokumonsen Rock (六文銭ロック; 2013–2015, art by Ryoichi Ikegami)
- Too Beat (2021–present, art by Shiro Yoshida)

=== As Sho Fumimura ===
- Hakkyū Suikoden Hoero Ryū (白球水滸伝 ほえろ竜; 1975, art by Mitsuru Hiruta)
- Ring no Takaō (リングのタカ王; 1975, art by Jiro Kuwata)
- Daiki no Mound (大器のマウンド; 1977–1978, art by Kenji Iwasaki)
- Phantom Burai (ファントム無頼; 1978–1984, art by Kaoru Shintani)
- Oh! Takarazuka (Oh! タカラヅカ; 1980–1983, art by Shinji Ono)
- Tenmadeagare (天まであがれ; 1981–1982, art by Tatsuo Kanai)
- Rettō 198X (列島198X; 1981–1982, art by Hajime Oki)
- Wild Way (ワイルドウェイ; 1982, art by Daisuke Inoue)
- Chu-high Lemon (酎ハイれもん; 1982–1984, art by Tsutomu Shinohara)
- Astronauts (1984–1988, art by Hajime Oki)
- Dr. Kumahige (Dr.クマひげ; 1985–1988, art by Takumi Nagayasu)
- Shogun (1988–1991, art by Jūzō Tokoro)
- Migi-muke Hidari! (右向け左!; 1989–1991, art by Shinichi Sugimura)
- Sanctuary (1990–1995, 12 volumes, art by Ryoichi Ikegami)
- Pappakapā (パッパカパー; 1992–1994, art by Tobio Mizuno)
- Odyssey (オデッセイ; 1995–1996, art by Ryoichi Ikegami)
- Tenkū Ninden Battle Voyager (天空忍伝バトルボイジャー; 1995–1997, art by Satoru Yuiga)
- G-Hard (1998–1999, art by Juzo Tokoro)
- Fūsen (フーセン; 2000, art by Tobio Mizuno)
- Silencer (2012–2014, art by Yuka Nagate)
- Begin (2016–2020, art by Ryoichi Ikegami)
