= Lord (manga) =

Japanese manga series

- First tankōbon volume cover

覇 -LORD- (Ha Rōdo)
- Genre: Action; Epic; Historical
- Manga
- Written by: Buronson
- Illustrated by: Ryoichi Ikegami
- Published by: Shogakukan
- Magazine: Big Comic Superior
- Original run: September 10, 2004 – February 10, 2011
- Volumes: 22
- Manga

Soul: Lord 2
- Written by: Buronson
- Illustrated by: Ryoichi Ikegami
- Published by: Shogakukan
- Magazine: Big Comic Superior
- Original run: June 10, 2011 – January 11, 2013
- Volumes: 3
- icon

Lord (Japanese: 覇 -LORD-, Hepburn: Ha Rōdo; "Hegemon -Lord-") is a Japanese manga series written by Buronson and illustrated by Ryoichi Ikegami. It was serialized in Shogakukan's seinen manga magazine Big Comic Superior from September 2004 to February 2011, with its chapters collected in 22 tankōbon volumes. The story is loosely based on the Three Kingdoms period, using both real and original characters and events from the historical period in Chinese history and folklore of the 14th century novel Romance of the Three Kingdoms by Luo Guanzhong. A sequel, titled Soul: Lord 2, was serialized in the same magazine from June 2011 to January 2013, with its chapters collected in three tankōbon volumes.

== Publication ==
Written by Buronson and illustrated by Ryoichi Ikegami, Lord was serialized in Shogakukan's seinen manga magazine Big Comic Superior from September 10, 2004, to February 10, 2011. (Note: The last chapter was published in the magazine's fifth issue of 2011, released on February 10 of the same year.) Shogakukan collected its chapters in 22 tankōbon volumes, released from January 28, 2005, to March 30, 2011.

A second part, Soul: Lord 2 (SOUL 覇 第2章, Sōru Rōdo Dai Ni-shō), was serialized in Big Comic Spirits from June 10, 2011, to January 11, 2013. Shogakukan collected its chapters in three tankōbon volumes, released from February 29, 2012, to March 29, 2013.

=== Volumes ===
==== Lord ====
No.	Japanese release date	Japanese ISBN
1	January 28, 2005	978-4-09-187511-2
2	April 26, 2005	978-4-09-187512-9
3	September 30, 2005	978-4-09-187513-6
4	December 26, 2005	978-4-09-187514-3
5	April 27, 2006	978-4-09-180326-9
6	July 28, 2006	978-4-09-180576-8
7	December 26, 2006	978-4-09-180896-7
8	April 27, 2007	978-4-09-181199-8
9	July 30, 2007	978-4-09-181377-0
10	November 30, 2007	978-4-09-181530-9
11	February 29, 2008	978-4-09-181750-1
12	May 30, 2008	978-4-09-181898-0
13	August 29, 2008	978-4-09-182136-2
14	November 28, 2008	978-4-09-182260-4
15	February 27, 2009	978-4-09-182374-8
16	July 30, 2009	978-4-09-182572-8
17	November 30, 2009	978-4-09-182767-8
18	January 29, 2010	978-4-09-183007-4
19	May 28, 2010	978-4-09-183165-1
20	August 30, 2010	978-4-09-183386-0
21	December 25, 2010	978-4-09-183536-9
22	March 30, 2011	978-4-09-183720-2

==== Soul: Lord 2 ====
No.	Japanese release date	Japanese ISBN
1	February 29, 2012	978-4-09-184398-2
2	August 30, 2012	978-4-09-184654-9
3	March 29, 2013	978-4-09-185136-9
