= Futari Daka =

Japanese manga and television series

- Cover of the 19th volume of Futari Daka

ふたり鷹
- Manga
- Written by: Kaoru Shintani
- Published by: Shogakukan
- Magazine: Weekly Shōnen Sunday
- Original run: 1981 – 1985
- Volumes: 19
- Anime television series
- Directed by: Tokizō Tsuchiya
- Music by: Joe Hisaishi
- Studio: Kokusai Eiga-sha
- Original network: Fuji TV, YTS
- Original run: September 20, 1984 – June 21, 1985
- Episodes: 36
- icon

Futari Daka (Japanese: ふたり鷹; lit. "Twin Hawks") is a Japanese motorcycle racing manga written and illustrated by Kaoru Shintani. It received the 1984 Shogakukan Manga Award for shōnen manga. The series focuses on Sawatari Taka and Toujou Taka as they compete with each other and other competitors in motorcycle racing. Their names means "hawk" and "falcon", respectively.

The manga was adapted as a 36 episode anime series broadcast on Fuji TV between September 20, 1984, and June 21, 1985. The anime premiered in France on March 11, 1990, and was released on La Cinq and Mangas. Only 32 were aired in France.

This is the last series to be animated by Kokusai Eiga-sha.

== Plot ==
When Taka Sawatari and his mother were heading home after having dinner, they were attacked by a motorcycle gang. They were saved by a mysterious young man. The next day, Sawatari learned that that young man was a professional racer who has the same first name, Taka Toujou. In a race, Sawatari loses control when entering a curve, nearly killing Toujou. After the event, the two become rivals as they compete against each other with their racing skills.

== Characters ==
=== Main characters ===
- Sawatari Taka (沢渡鷹, Taka Sawatari) Voiced by: Tohru Furuya
- Tōjō Taka (東条鷹, Taka Tōjō) Voiced by: Kaneto Shiozawa
- Kogure Asako (あさこ こぐれ, Asako Kogure) Voiced by: Hiromi Tsuru

=== Guest appearances ===
Pops Yoshimura and David Aldana made some celebrity appearances throughout the series.

== Anime ==
The opening theme for the series was "The Heartbreak Crossin'" (ハートブレイクCrossin', Hātobureiku Crossin') and the ending theme was "Sayonara o Iwa Nai De Kure" (サヨナラを言わないでくれ), both performed by Takanori Jinnai. Music for the series was composed by Joe Hisaishi.
