= Cleopatra DC =

Japanese manga series and its adaptation

- Cleopatra D.C.
- Cover art for the Cleopatra DC DVD release

クレオパトラD.C (Kureopatora D.C.)
- Genre: Adventure
- Manga
- Written by: Kaoru Shintani
- Published by: Scholar Publishing
- Magazine: Comic Burger
- Original run: 1986 – 1991
- Volumes: 8
- Original video animation
- Directed by: Naoyuki Yoshinaga
- Studio: J.C.Staff
- Licensed by: NA: AnimeWorks
- Released: April 28, 1989 – May 24, 1991
- Runtime: 37 minutes
- Episodes: 3
- icon

Cleopatra DC (クレオパトラD.C, Kureopatora D.C.) is a Japanese manga series written and illustrated by Kaoru Shintani about a fictional United States corporation, led by the beautiful and spirited Cleopatra Corns.

== Plot ==
Cleopatra, or Cleo as she is known to her friends, would much rather go on vacation in some exotic locale than concern herself with the business end of the Corns Conglomerate, which is the most powerful economic player in the United States. However, Cleo has a kind and forgiving nature, and will not shy away if trouble is near. And more often than she cares for, Cleo and her friends find themselves in all sorts of fantastic adventures, from putting out oil well fires to safeguarding a powerful telepathic girl.

== Characters ==
- Cleopatra Corns (Voiced by: Maria Kawamura)
- Swen (Voiced by: Hiromi Tsuru)
- Nacky (Voiced by: Keiichi Nanba)
- Shorty (Voiced by: Hideyuki Tanaka)
- Marianne (Voiced by: Yoshino Takamori)
- Colonel Karts (Voiced by: Yuusaku Yara)
- Mysterious Woman (Voiced by: Yoshiko Sakakibara)
- Sarah (Voiced by: Chisa Yokoyama)

== Episodes ==
- "Lighting Bolt of Apollo"
- "Crystal Pharaoh"
- "Pandora's Box"
