= Kaoru Shintani =

Japanese manga artist (born 1951)

Kaoru Shintani (新谷 かおる, Shintani Kaoru; born April 26, 1951 in Toyonaka, Osaka, Japan) is a Japanese manga artist. Shintani is best known for his series Area 88. In addition to his pilot comics, Shintani has ventured into science fiction, fantasy, comedy, and hentai comics as well. In 1985, he was awarded the Shogakukan Manga Award for shōnen for Area 88 and Futari Daka.

Shintani began his career in 1972 as a shōjo artist and was nominated for the Ribon Comics Award for best new artist of that year. After working as an assistant to Leiji Matsumoto, the creator of Space Pirate Captain Harlock and Galaxy Express 999 and the creative director for Space Battleship Yamato, Shintani began to publish aviator titles in various comic magazines. Serialization of Area 88 began in 1979 and the title has been popular ever since.

While working as an assistant to Matsumoto, one of Shintani's duties was to construct plastic models for drawing reference. Matsumoto often states that he based the character Yattaran (who appears as a supporting character in several Harlock stories) on Shintani.

== Works ==
=== Manga ===
All titles written and illustrated by Shintani, except where noted.

- Phantom Burai (1978–1984) – written by Sho Fumimura
- Area 88 (1979–1986)
- Senjou Roman (1979)
- Silver Sight (1979)
- Sonic Deserter (1980)
- Futari Daka (1981–1985)
- Series 1/1000 Sec (1981)
- Queen 1313 (1983)
- Milky Command: Galaxy Warrior (1983) - written by Kiichiro Iwa
- Balancer (1985–1986)
- Cleopatra DC (1986–1991)
- Alice 12 (1987)
- Hidari no O'Clock!! (1988)
- Goddamn (1988–1990)
- Desert Rose (1989–1998)
- Shiro to Kuro no Hitsuji (1990)
- Elan (1990)
- Gentle Man (1991)
- Reppuden (1993)
- Buttobi CPU (1993–1997)
- Pascal City (1995)
- Toushin Youhiden (2000)
- Hinomaru Agete (2000)
- Navi (2000)
- Dragon Company (2001)
- Raise (2005)
- Quo Vadis (2007–present)
- Young Miss Holmes (2007–2011)
- Christie London Massive (2011–2017)

=== Original video animation ===
- Area 88 (1985, based on Shintani's manga)
- Cleopatra DC (1989, based on Shintani's manga, screenplay by Shintani)
- Desert Rose (1993, based on Shintani's manga, screenplay by Shintani)
- I Dream of Mimi (1997, based on Shintani's manga Buttobi CPU)

=== Television ===
- Space Emperor God Sigma (1980–1981, character design by Shintani)
- Futari Daka (1984–1985, based on Shintani's manga)
- Area 88 (2004, based on Shintani's manga)
