= Begin (manga) =

Japanese manga series

- First tankōbon volume cover
- Manga
- Written by: Sho Fumimura
- Illustrated by: Ryoichi Ikegami
- Published by: Shogakukan
- Magazine: Big Comic Superior
- Original run: October 14, 2016 – January 10, 2020
- Volumes: 9
- icon

Begin (stylized in all caps) is a Japanese manga series written by Sho Fumimura and illustrated by Ryoichi Ikegami. It was serialized in Shogakukan's seinen manga magazine Big Comic Superior from October 2016 to January 2020, with its chapters collected in nine tankōbon volumes.

== Publication ==
Written by Sho Fumimura and illustrated by Ryoichi Ikegami, Begin was serialized in Shogakukan's seinen manga magazine Big Comic Superior from October 14, 2016, to January 10, 2020. Shogakukan collected its chapters in nine tankōbon volumes, released from July 28, 2017, to March 30, 2020.

=== Volumes ===
No.	Japanese release date	Japanese ISBN
1	July 28, 2017	978-4-09-189361-1
2	July 28, 2017	978-4-09-189608-7
3	November 30, 2017	978-4-09-189708-4
4	April 27, 2018	978-4-09-189865-4
5	October 30, 2018	978-4-09-860123-3
6	February 28, 2019	978-4-09-860227-8
7	June 28, 2019	978-4-09-860321-3
8	November 29, 2019	978-4-09-860490-6
9	March 30, 2020	978-4-09-860569-9
