= Mai, the Psychic Girl =

Japanese manga series

- First tankōbon volume cover

舞 (Mai)
- Genre: Action, science fiction
- Manga
- Written by: Kazuya Kudō
- Illustrated by: Ryoichi Ikegami
- Published by: Shogakukan; Media Factory (reprint)
- English publisher: NA: Viz Communications / Eclipse Comics
- Imprint: Shōnen Sunday Comics
- Magazine: Weekly Shōnen Sunday
- Original run: March 20, 1985 – April 2, 1986
- Volumes: 6
- icon

Mai, the Psychic Girl (舞, Mai) is a Japanese manga series written by Kazuya Kudō and illustrated by Ryoichi Ikegami. It was serialized in Shogakukan's shōnen manga magazine Weekly Shōnen Sunday from March 1985 to April 1986, with its chapters collected in six tankōbon volumes; it was later republished by Media Factory.

Mai, the Psychic Girl was one of the first manga series to be fully published in English; it was published by Viz Communications, in partnership with Eclipse Comics, in a bi-weekly comic book format starting in 1987 and republished in collected volumes a few years later.

== Story ==
The story follows Mai Kuju (久住 舞, Kujū Mai), a 14-year-old girl with powerful psychic abilities. She is being pursued by the Wisdom Alliance, an organization which secretly strives to control the world. The alliance already controls four other powerful psychic children, and it has hired the Kaieda Intelligence Agency to capture Mai.

== Media ==
=== Manga ===
Written by Kazuya Kudo and illustrated by Ryoichi Ikegami, Mai, the Psychic Girl was serialized in Shogakukan's shōnen manga magazine Weekly Shōnen Sunday from March 20, 1985, to April 2, 1986. Shogakukan collected its chapters in six tankōbon volumes, released from August 1985 to August 1986. Media Factory republished the series in three bunkoban volumes, released from 2002 to 2003, and in two wideban volumes in 2006.

Mai, the Psychic Girl was one of the first manga series to be fully published in English. Along with The Legend of Kamui and Area 88, Mai, the Psychic Girl was one of the first three manga published by Viz Communications, in partnership with Eclipse Comics. It was published in a bi-weekly comic book format starting in May 1987. As it was one of the forerunners of manga popularity in the West, Mai was chosen for localization due to its middle-ground artwork: neither "too Japanese or too American." It was presented in the "flopped" format; panels and pages read in the left-to-right reading order instead of the Japanese style of right-to-left, that was the norm with early localized manga. Along with the other two series, Mai proved popular enough that second printings were needed of the first two issues. The series was later reprinted in a 4-volume edition by Titan Books in 1989, and by Viz in 1990; the edition featured a brief nude scene that had been edited out of the comic book edition. In 1996, the series was re-released in a three-volume edition, titled Mai, the Psychic Girl: Perfect Collection.

=== Film ===
Beginning in the late 1980s, Ron Mael and Russell Mael of the band Sparks attempted to make Mai, the Psychic Girl into a musical, with interest from Tim Burton and Carolco Pictures, who purchased the film rights in August 1991. Carolco hoped Burton would start production in 1992, but he chose to work on The Nightmare Before Christmas and Ed Wood for Disney. The option on the film rights eventually expired, and Burton dropped out. Francis Ford Coppola later developed the property in the 1990s. In June 2000, Sony Pictures Entertainment started on a new different project with Kirk Wong attached to direct. By February 2001, a script had been written by Lisa Addario and Joey Syracuse for Sony's Columbia Pictures. The release of The Seduction of Ingmar Bergman, a radio musical by Sparks, in August 2009, was informed by the six years the band spent trying to get their Mai, the Psychic Girl produced. The album generated new interest, and gained a "second wind", Russell Mael explained. "The music is all ready and we are hoping that this still might see the light of day". In 2010, Burton expressed renewed interest in adapting the property.

== Reception ==
Mai, the Psychic Girl was well received by critics and readers in America (more so than in its native Japan), and is recognized as an important first step in the gradual popularity of manga in America. Many praised the series for avoiding typical superhero clichés and for also introducing many readers to the world of manga.

In Issue 5 of Gateways, Jeffrey Gomez noted "Kazuya Kudo's and Ryoichi Ikegami's production of Mai, the Psychic Girl most certainly stands as a shining example of the art [of manga] ... Mai is a combination of everything that makes manga a definite interest for anyone involved with comics, science fantasy, and solid, exciting story-telling."
