= Young Miss Holmes =

Japanese manga series

- Cover of the first omnibus volume of Young Miss Holmes, featuring the main protagonist Christie Hope

クリスティ ハイテンション (Kurisuti Hai Tenshon)
- Genre: Mystery
- Manga
- Written by: Kaoru Shintani
- Published by: Media Factory
- English publisher: NA: Seven Seas Entertainment
- Magazine: Comic Flapper
- Original run: August 2006 – September 2011
- Volumes: 7
- Manga

Christie London Massive
- Written by: Kaoru Shintani
- Published by: Media Factory
- Magazine: Comic Flapper
- Original run: November 2011 – May 2017
- Volumes: 4

Young Miss Holmes, known in Japan as Christie High Tension (Japanese: クリスティ ハイテンション, Hepburn: Kurisuti Hai Tenshon) is a Japanese manga series written and illustrated by Kaoru Shintani. It was serialized in Comic Flapper from 2007 to 2011, with the chapters collected into seven tankōbon volumes by Media Factory. Young Miss Holmes is a mystery series following Crystal "Christie" Margaret Hope, the 10-year-old niece of Sherlock Holmes who has inherited his skills of deduction and logical reasoning, as she partakes in some of Holmes' most famous cases. In 2011 Seven Seas Entertainment announced they had acquired the rights to the series and that they would release it in omnibus editions. The series was followed up with a sequel series titled Christie London Massive (クリスティ・ロンドンマッシブ).

== Synopsis ==
The series follows Christie, the niece of Sherlock Holmes. She's shown to be incredibly clever and inquisitive, much to the chagrin of those close to her, including her maids Annemarie Hopkins (an American skilled in firearms, but of a gentle nature) and Nora (a cocky, whip-wielding former street rat).

== Reception ==
The School Library Journal wrote a mixed review for the first omnibus release, as they enjoyed the story and characters but criticized it for being marked as "all ages" given the inclusion of a crossover with Dance in the Vampire Bund, which the company played up as a feature. They commented that "it wouldn’t be a problem here if Seven Seas had either promoted the crossover elements but rated Young Miss Holmes Teen/13+ so as to have less of an abrupt change between it and Dance or if Seven Seas had kept Young Miss Holmes at a lower rating but downplayed the crossover as much as possible, so as to keep the young audience for Young Miss Holmes separated from the more mature audience of Dance." Anime News Network was more positive, writing that it was "Fairly faithful to Holmesian literature in general and the period, detailed art, interesting characters" and that the "Crossover with Dance in the Vampire Bund is nicely executed."
