= Giganto Maxia =

Japanese manga series by Kentaro Miura

- Volume cover

ギガントマキア (Gigantomakia)
- Genre: Adventure; Post-apocalyptic; Science fantasy
- Manga
- Written by: Kentaro Miura
- Published by: Hakusensha
- English publisher: NA: Dark Horse Comics
- Imprint: Jets Comics
- Magazine: Young Animal
- Original run: November 22, 2013 – March 14, 2014
- Volumes: 1
- icon

Giganto Maxia (Japanese: ギガントマキア, Hepburn: Gigantomakia) is a Japanese manga series written and illustrated by Kentaro Miura. It was serialized in Hakusensha's seinen manga magazine Young Animal from November 2013 to March 2014, with its chapters collected in a single tankōbon volume.

== Plot ==
The story is set 100 million years in the future after an event called the Great Destruction. Colossal bug-like monsters roam the wastelands, used by the Empire of Olympus in their epic war against Alcyoneus and his nether-forces. The gladiator Delos, the mystic Prome, and the titan Gohra are tasked to end the bloodshed and heal the planet.

== Publication ==
Written and illustrated by Kentaro Miura, Giganto Maxia was Miura's first completely original work in 24 years since Berserk. It was serialized for six chapters in Hakusensha's seinen manga magazine Young Animal from November 22, 2013, to February 14, 2014. A bonus chapter was published on March 14, 2014. Hakusensha collected its chapters in a single tankōbon volume, released on July 29, 2014.

In North America, the series was licensed for English release by Dark Horse Comics. The collected volume was released on February 3, 2016.

No.	Original release date	Original ISBN	English release date	English ISBN
1	July 29, 2014	978-4-592-14001-6	February 3, 2016	978-1-61655-947-2

== Reception ==
In a review for Otaku USA, Jason Thompson praised the series for its intricate artwork and imaginative setting. He noted that despite its violent content, the manga maintains a hopeful tone and a clear moral framework, favoring a compassionate black-and-white worldview rather than a grimdark one—a departure from the darker style of Miura's Berserk. Thompson also drew parallels between the series and Greek mythology, as well as other post-apocalyptic science-fantasy works such as Nausicaä of the Valley of the Wind.
