= Heat (manga) =

Japanese manga series

- First tankōbon volume cover

HEAT -灼熱- (Hīto Shakunetsu)
- Genre: Action; Crime; Thriller
- Manga
- Written by: Buronson
- Illustrated by: Ryoichi Ikegami
- Published by: Shogakukan
- Imprint: Big Comics
- Magazine: Big Comic Superior
- Original run: 1998 – 2004
- Volumes: 17
- icon

Heat (Japanese: HEAT-灼熱-, Hepburn: Hīto Shakunetsu) is a Japanese manga series written by Buronson and illustrated by Ryoichi Ikegami. It was serialized in Shogakukan's seinen manga magazine Big Comic Superior from 1998 to 2004. It was adapted into a two live-action films which premiered in 2004.

In 2002, Heat won the 47th Shogakukan Manga Award for the general manga category.

== Plot ==
The story follows a young man named Tatsumi Karasawa (唐沢 辰巳, Karasawa Tatsumi), who suddenly rises in the criminal world of Shinjuku, Tokyo, and becomes the leader of a group of amateurs who show no reluctance to face police and gangs alike. His successes in the Tokyo underground cause a chief and a yakuza boss to create a conspiracy to eliminate him.

== Media ==
=== Manga ===
Written by Buronson and illustrated by Ryoichi Ikegami, Heat was serialized in Shogakukan's seinen manga magazine Big Comic Superior from 1998 to 2004. Shogakukan collected its chapters in seventeen tankōbon volumes, released from March 30, 1999, to May 28, 2004.

=== Films ===
Two live action films distributed by KSS, Heat and Heat 2, premiered on February 14, 2004. The films, directed by Kenji Yokoi, star Shinji Kasahara as Tatsumi Karasawa. Heat and Heat 2 were released on home video on April 9 and May 14, 2004, respectively.

== Reception ==
Heat won the 47th Shogakukan Manga Award for the general manga category in 2002.
