= Ryoichi Ikegami =

Japanese manga artist (born 1944)

Ryoichi Ikegami 池上 遼一
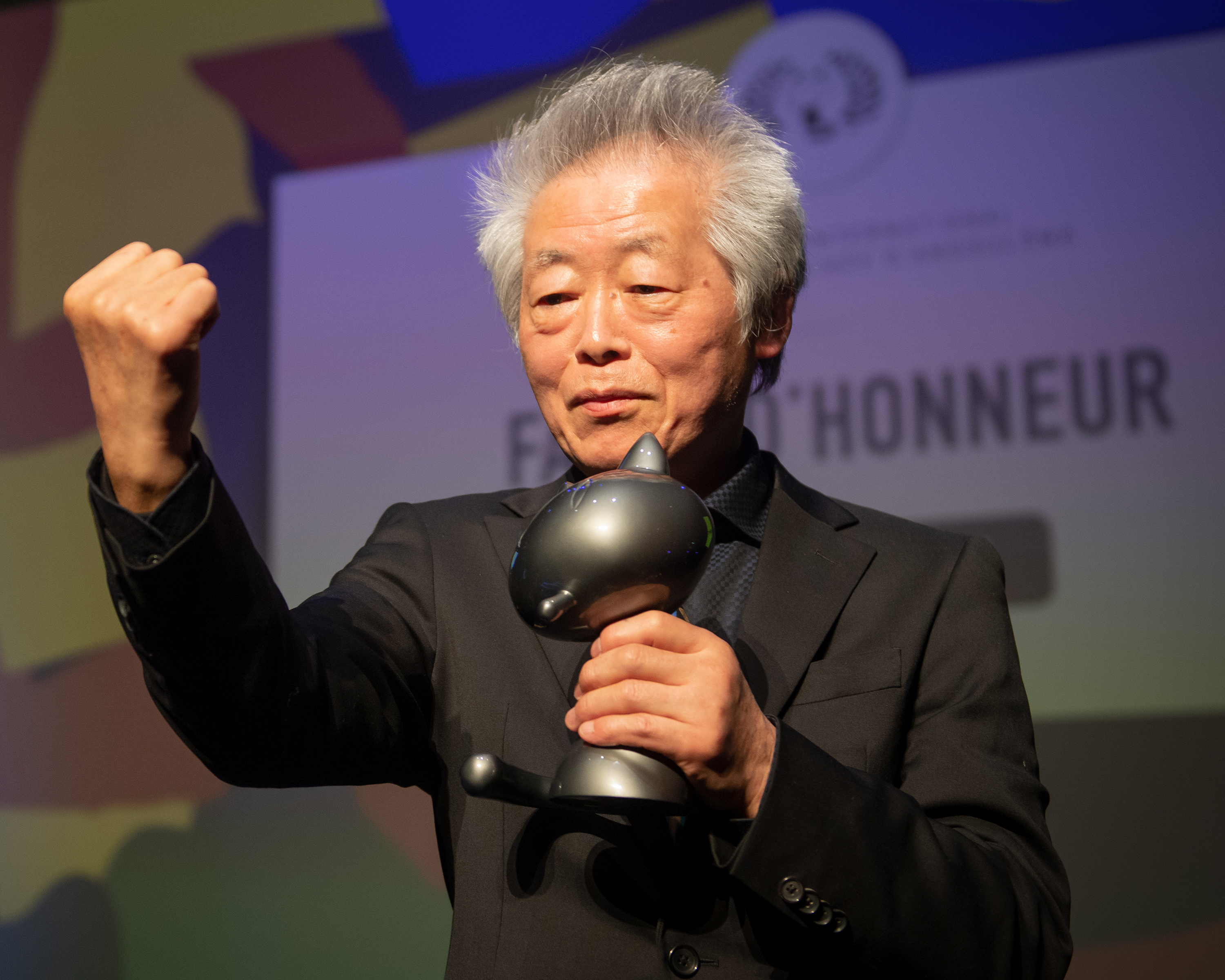
- Ryoichi Ikegami in 2023
- Born: May 29, 1944 (age 82) Takefu, Fukui, Japan
- Area: Manga artist
- Notable works: Wounded Man; Mai, the Psychic Girl; Crying Freeman; Sanctuary; Heat
- Awards: Inkpot Award (1995); Shogakukan Manga Award (2001)

Ryoichi Ikegami (Japanese: 池上 遼一, Hepburn: Ikegami Ryōichi; born May 29, 1944) is a Japanese manga artist that usually works as the illustrator in collaboration with a writer. He is best known for Crying Freeman (1986–1988), written by Kazuo Koike, and Heat (1999–2004), written by Buronson (AKA Sho Fumimura). The latter won the 2001 Shogakukan Manga Award for general manga. Ikegami received the Fauves d'Honneur at the 2023 Angoulême International Comics Festival. Yoshihide Fujiwara is a former assistant of Ikegami's.

== Career ==
After graduating from junior high school, Ikegami moved to Osaka and drew manga while working as a billboard sign painter, debuting at the age of 17 writing rental comics. In 1966, he published a story called Tsumi no Ishiki (罪の意識) in the gekiga magazine Garo that caught the eye of fellow Garo contributor, Shigeru Mizuki, who offered him a job as his assistant. Ikegami accepted and moved to Tokyo where he worked as Mizuki's assistant for two and a half years. From a young age Ikegami had admired Takao Saito and Yoshiharu Tsuge, so he was delighted to work with Tsuge as Mizuki's assistant. Ikegami is also a fan of American comics, particularly Neal Adams.

Ikegami has worked on several popular series, such as Mai, the Psychic Girl with writer Kazuya Kudo, Crying Freeman, with writer Kazuo Koike, as well as Sanctuary and Heat with writer Sho Fumimura. He also wrote and drew Spider-Man: The Manga, a manga version of Spider-Man and collaborated with Garon Tsuchiya for the manga Box.

In 2001, he won the Shogakukan Manga Award for general manga as the artist of Heat. He became a professor at Osaka University of Arts in 2005.

From 2016 to 2020, he and Sho Fumimura created Begin in Big Comic Superior. Ikegami teamed up with writer Richard Woo for M no Shirushi -MacArthur Ansatsu Keikaku- (2020) for Big Comic Superior. It tells the story of a plot to assassinate Douglas MacArthur.

A character called Kēichi Kurata (played by Masataka Kubota) in the TV-drama GeGeGe no Nyōbō is modeled after him. He did a collaboration manga for the anime Girls und Panzer.

== Selected works ==
- Spider-Man: The Manga (スパイダーマン) (1970–1971): Written by Kōsei Ono and Kazumasa Hirai
- I Ueo Boy (I・餓男 アイウエオボーイ) (1973–1977): Written by Kazuo Koike, serialized in general-interest magazine Shūkan Gendai
- Otoko Gumi (男組) (1974–1979): Written by Tetsu Kariya, serialized in Weekly Shōnen Sunday
- Otoko Oozora (男大空) (1980–1982): Written by Tetsu Kariya, serialized in Weekly Shōnen Sunday
- Wounded Man (傷追い人) (1981–1986): Written by Kazuo Koike
- Mai, the Psychic Girl (舞) (1985–1986): Written by Kazuya Kudō, serialized in Weekly Shōnen Sunday
- Nobunaga (信長) (1986–1987): Written by Kazuya Kudō
- Crying Freeman (クライングフリーマン) (1986–1988): Written by Kazuo Koike
- Offered (オファード) (1990–1991): Written by Kazuo Koike
- Sanctuary (サンクチュアリ) (1990–1995): Written by Sho Fumimura
- Samurai Crusader (王立院雲丸の生涯) (1991–1992): Written by Oji Hiroi
- Strain (ストレイン) (1996–1998): Written by Buronson
- Heat (HEAT-灼熱-) (1998–2004): Written by Buronson
- Bestia - ryūgetsushō (ベスティア～流月抄) (2000–2004)
- Lord (覇-LORD-) (2004–2011): Written by Buronson
- Rokumonsen Rock (六文銭ロック) (2013–2015): Written by Buronson
- Adam and Eve (アダムとイブ, Adamu to Ibu) (2015–2016): Written by Hideo Yamamoto
- Begin (2016–2020): Written by Sho Fumimura
- Trillion Game (トリリオンゲーム) (2020–2025): Written by Riichiro Inagaki
