= I Dream of Mimi =

Japanese manga series

- First tankōbon volume cover

ぶっとび!!CPU (Buttobi!! Shī Pī Yū)
- Genre: Erotic comedy; Science fiction
- Manga
- Written by: Kaoru Shintani
- Published by: Hakusensha
- Imprint: Jets Comics
- Magazine: Young Animal
- Original run: 1993 – 1997
- Volumes: 3
- Original video animation
- Directed by: Masamitsu Hidaka
- Written by: Atsuhiro Tomioka
- Music by: Kanji Saitou (1–2); Harukichi Yamamoto (3)
- Studio: Pink Pineapple (production); OLM Team Wasaki (animation)
- Licensed by: NA: The Right Stuf International
- Released: April 25, 1997 – September 26, 1997
- Runtime: 27–28 minutes
- Episodes: 3
- icon

I Dream of Mimi, known in Japan as Buttobi!! CPU (Japanese: ぶっとび!!CPU, Hepburn: Buttobi!! Shī Pī Yū; 'Blasting Off!! CPU'), is a Japanese manga series written and illustrated by Kaoru Shintani. It was serialized in Hakusensha's seinen manga magazine Young Animal from 1993 to 1997, with its chapters collected in three tankōbon volumes. The series was adapted into a three-episode original video animation (OVA) produced by Pink Pineapple and animated by OLM in 1997. It was released in North America by The Right Stuf International.

== Plot ==
A college student named Akira Takaoka (高岡 章, Takaoka Akira) has saved up a large sum of money to buy the latest and best personal computer—only to find out they are sold out. He then finds what he thinks is the same model number in an alley, and buys the large, boxed-up machine from a shady salesman nearby. When he gets home, Akira is shocked to find that his new computer is a bio-android shaped like a pretty young lady called Mimi (ミミ). He is even more shocked when she tells him that she constantly needs his semen to refresh her physical memory.

== Characters ==
Character	Japanese voice	English voice
Akira Takaoka	Katsuaki Arima	Chick Peter
Mimi Takaoka (Codenamed 'Pixie')	Tomoko Ishimura	Angora Deb
Kanako Shimada	Hiroko Konishi	Megan Hollingshead
Junpei	Nobutoshi Hayashi	Chris Yates
Quadra	Kotono Mitsuishi	Meg Frances
Forte	Yuriko Yamaguchi	Carrie Grant
Futoshi	Makoto Higo	Will Hirsh
Perfoma	Yuko Miyamura	Syndi Snackwell
Centris	Maya Okamoto	Megan Hollingshead

== Media ==
=== Manga ===
Written and illustrated by Kaoru Shintani, I Dream of Mimi was serialized in Hakusensha's seinen manga magazine Young Animal from 1993 to 1997. Hakusensha collected its chapters in three tankōbon volumes, released from May 29, 1995, to December 17, 1997. The series was re-released by Media Factory in two bunkoban volumes, published on April 5 and May 2, 2003.

==== Volumes ====
No.	Release date	ISBN
1	May 29, 1995	4-592-13592-X
2	June 28, 1996	4-592-13593-8
3	December 17, 1997	4-592-13594-6

=== Original video animation ===
A three-episode original video animation (OVA), produced by Pink Pineapple and animated by OLM, was released from April 25 to September 26, 1997. The three episodes were released on DVD on May 25, 2001.

In North America, the OVA was licensed by The Right Stuf International Inc. and released on home video on March 26, 2001. The OVA was re-released on March 27, 2004.

==== Episodes ====
No.	Title	Original release date
1	"Extreme Access"; Transliteration: "Kageki ni Akusesu" (Japanese: 過激にアクセス)	April 25, 1997
Akira gets Mimi and learns how to use the bio-computer.
2	"Hang Up Gently"; Transliteration: "Yasashiku Hangu Appu" (Japanese: やさしくハングアップ)	June 27, 1997
Mimi has adventures online facing off against other bio-computers.
3	"Graceful Reset"; Transliteration: "Yūga ni Risetto" (Japanese: 優雅にリセット)	September 26, 1997
Akira and Mimi face off against an American invasion by Nackintosh bio-computers.

== Reception ==
Christopher Macdonald of Anime News Network described the OVA as much better animated than the average hentai, praised its comedy, and noted that, despite its classification as an "erotic comedy", it could be watched and enjoyed by anyone not offended by the sexual content. Stig Høgset of THEM Anime Reviews praised the series for its art and characters but criticized its "enemy of the month" syndrome, which began in episode two and continued thereafter, as well as its short length.

The series was reviewed by four critics at AnimeOnDVD. Jamal Sacranie wrote that the OVA suited anyone seeking a light hentai or something funny, commenting that, despite its hentai label, the scenes were not graphic, did not explicitly depict any action, and that most of it was implied. Michael Thomas highlighted the OVA's high technical quality, praising the attention to detail in costumes, character designs, settings, and choreography. Thomas noted its probable influence on other bishōjo android series such as Chobits, Mahoromatic, and Hand Maid May. He called it a fun, racy, adult romp into cyberspace and a good parody of the cyber-culture existing in Japan and America. Luis Cruz wrote that labeling the OVA as a hentai did it a disservice, stating that it was primarily a comedy and that its sexual content was along the lines of the American Pie and Porky's franchises but less graphic than either. Cruz wrote that, despite limited character development, the series' core was parody and comedy, delivered in sufficient quantity to allow viewers to overlook such plot flaws. He called it an R-rated Chobits, amusing, cute, and a little bit naughty. Chris Beveridge wrote that, although the jokes were repeated throughout, the OVA contained other computer-related humor that was very enjoyable, adding that it was light, fun, and ultimately not demeaning—a trap into which many ecchi or hentai shows fell or leapt. He concluded with a definite recommendation.
