= Area 88 =

1985 Japanese manga series and its franchise

- Cover for the first manga volume, featuring Shin Kazama

エリア88 (Eria Hachijū-Hachi)
- Genre: Action, military, slice of life
- Manga
- Written by: Kaoru Shintani
- Published by: Shogakukan
- English publisher: NA: Eclipse Comics/Viz Media
- Magazine: Shōnen Big Comic
- Original run: 1979 – 1986
- Volumes: 23
- Original video animation
- Directed by: Hisayuki Toriumi
- Produced by: Yuji Nunokawa
- Written by: Akiyoshi Sakai
- Music by: Ichiro Nitta
- Studio: Studio Pierrot
- Licensed by: AUS: Madman Entertainment; NA: Discotek Media; UK: ADV Films
- Released: February 5, 1985 – August 15, 1986
- Runtime: 200 minutes (total): 55 minutes (ep. 1) 48 minutes (ep. 2) 97 minutes (ep. 3)
- Episodes: 3 (Japanese ver.); 2 (International ver.) (Note: Episodes 1 and 2 are compiled into a single 100-minute film in the International version.)
- Anime television series
- Directed by: Isamu Imakake
- Produced by: Ryōsuke Takahashi
- Written by: Hiroshi Ōnogi
- Music by: Kazunori Miyake
- Studio: Group TAC
- Licensed by: AUS: Madman Entertainment; NA: ADV Films; UK: ADV Films
- Original network: TV Asahi, Animax
- English network: SEA: Animax Asia
- Original run: January 8, 2004 – March 25, 2004
- Episodes: 12
- icon

Area 88 (エリア88, Eria Hachijū-Hachi) is a Japanese manga series by Kaoru Shintani serialized between 1979 and 1986. The story is about a young pilot named Shin Kazama and his experiences at Area 88, a mercenary air force base secluded in the desert in the fictional nation of Aslan. Shin goes from head of his class at a world-renowned aviation school, dating the beautiful daughter of an airline president, to a mercenary fighter pilot bound to Area 88 by a three-year contract that he was duped into signing by a jealous and competitive childhood friend. He is determined to earn $1.5 million to buy his way out of the obligation and return home, and killing becomes second nature to him as he quickly rises to the top rank at Area 88. Overwrought with shame and self-loathing for what he has become, Shin begins to question whether he is still fighting for survival, or, like his fellow mercenaries, for the sheer excitement and camaraderie of battle.

Area 88 was among the first three manga to be translated into English and published in North America. It had been adapted into an OVA in 1985, a video game in 1989 (released in North America as U.N. Squadron), and a 12-episode anime television series in 2004. It is also a brand of model aircraft in Japan. While it appeals to aviation fans for its realistic depictions of aircraft and aerial combat, it has also been critically acclaimed for its strong character development and Shintani's poignant storytelling, combining action, tragedy, romance, and comedy. In 1984, the manga received the Shogakukan Manga Award for shōnen.

== Story ==
Area 88 takes place in the fictional Middle Eastern kingdom of Aslan (alternatively transcribed as "Asran"). The government uses mercenary fighter pilots, stationed at the desert airbase Area 88, to fight its war and pays them for each enemy aircraft shot down. Each pilot's contract lasts three years; early cancellation costs $1.5 million. Deserting Area 88 is considered a capital offense punished by death.

The story follows ace pilot Shin Kazama as he attempts to serve out his contract to return to his fiancée in Japan. As the war progresses, Shin must face his shifting acceptance of the violence that fills his days. Among his compatriots at Area 88 are: Mickey Simon, a United States Navy veteran of the Vietnam War; McCoy, a greedy weapons dealer who sells the pilots everything they need; photojournalist Goh "Rocky" Mutsugi (Makoto Shinjou in the TV series); Danish pilot Greg Gates; and Lt. Colonel Saki Vashtar, a member of Aslan's royal family and the commander of Area 88.

Shin's past is told through flashbacks during the story. He and his best friend, Satoru Kanzaki, were up-and-coming airline pilots for Yamato Airlines, and Shin had started a relationship with the CEO's daughter, Ryoko Tsugumo. Envious of Shin's success, Satoru tricked him into signing the contract that landed him in Area 88. While Shin fights in the bloody war, Satoru courts Ryoko and rises through the ranks of Yamato Airlines. Ryoko discovers Shin is still alive through one of Goh's/Makoto's photos and resolves to find him.

=== Endings ===
While each version of Area 88 shared the same basic premise and some story arcs, they each had key differences, most notably in the endings.

The original manga ending showed Shin returning to Japan, but having lost all memory of Area 88. The English-language version published by Eclipse Comics was left unfinished. In the three-episode OVA adaptation from 1985, Shin was discharged from service to escort the king of Aslan to Paris in exile. Despite being free and making contact with Ryoko, Shin flies back to Aslan, having changed in his time at Area 88. His ultimate fate is left uncertain. The 2004 TV series truncated the story to just after Shin lost his F-5E. In this version, Makoto, the photojournalist, was originally sent to Area 88 by Satoru to capture a photo of Shin dying to prove his death to Ryoko. Shin survives the events of the series and Makoto, swayed to help Shin, returns to Japan and derails Satoru's plot to marry Ryoko.

=== Aircraft ===
Many real-life aircraft are featured in the series, including combat, civilian, and experimental aircraft.

Attackers

- A-1 Skyraider
- A-4E/F Skyhawk
- RA-5C Vigilante
- A-6E Intruder
- A-7E Corsair II
- A-10A Thunderbolt II
- OV-10A Bronco
- Sea Harrier FRS Mk.1
- AV-8A Harrier II
- SEPECAT Jaguar
- Blackburn Buccaneer
- Yak-38 Forger

Cargo aircraft

- C-1 Trader
- C-47 Skytrain
- C-130E Hercules

Fighters and interceptors

- Dassault Mirage F1
- Dassault Mirage 2000
- English Electric Lightning
- F-4J/E Phantom II
- F-5A/E Freedom Fighter/Tiger II
- F-8E Crusader
- F-14A Tomcat
- F-15A Eagle
- F-16A Fighting Falcon
- F-20A Tigershark
- F-104G Starfighter
- F-105D Thunderchief
- F-100D Super Sabre
- RF-101C Voodoo
- F-111 Aardvark
- F/A-18A Hornet
- Fiat G.91
- IAI Kfir
- J35F Draken
- Su-33 Flanker
- MiG-17 Fresco
- MiG-19 Farmer
- MiG-21 Fishbed
- MiG-23 Flogger
- MiG-27D Flogger
- Grumman X-29

Patrol aircraft

- E-2 Hawkeye
- S-2 Tracker
- S-3 Viking

Trainers

- T-6 Texan
- T-38 Talon

Bombers

- B-1 Lancer
- B-52 Stratofortress
- Tu-95 'Bear'

Civilian

- McDonnell Douglas MD-11
- Boeing 747
- Learjet
- Cessna 150
- Cessna 172

Helicopters

- AH-1 Cobra
- AH-64 Apache
- CH-53 Sea Stallion
- CH-54 Tarhe
- UH-1 Iroquois
- SA-341 Gazelle
- SH-3 Sea King
- OH-6 Cayuse
- Bell 206 Jetranger

== Media ==
=== Manga ===
The original Japanese manga of Area 88 was serialized in 23 volumes between 1979 and 1986 by Shogakukan. Each volume was black and white with a painted color cover and contained several short stories called "missions". In all, there were 172 such missions across the 23 volumes. Shōnen Sunday later repackaged the 23 volumes into ten thick books under its Wide Volume product line.

Area 88, along with Mai, the Psychic Girl and The Legend of Kamui, was one of the first three manga to be translated to English and published in North America by Eclipse Comics and VIZ Media in May 1987. It was published bi-weekly with each issue containing a single mission, of which the editors had planned to release all 172. The first 28 issues featured covers from the original manga plus some original artwork by Shintani, but as these resources were limited, the covers of issues #29–36 featured stills from the OVA film. With issue #37 in December 1988, VIZ Media took over the series, and in addition to featuring photographs of actual fighter jets on the cover, the publication went from bi-weekly to monthly and the price from $1.50 to $1.75. The series did not adjust well to the dramatic change, and with issue #42 in May 1989, without resolving the storyline, it was canceled. It was later run as a feature in Viz's Animerica magazine (Vol. 1, No. 8 – Vol. 3, No. 2), but only lasted until January 1995 without the series being completed.

- Shogakukan (Shonen Big Comics, 1979–1986)

Vol.	Japanese release date	Japanese ISBN
01	November 5, 1979	978-4091501318
02	February 5, 1980	978-4091501325
03	June 5, 1980	978-4091501332
04	September 5, 1980	978-4091501349
05	December 5, 1980	978-4091501356
06	June 5, 1981	978-4091501363
07	September 5, 1981	978-4091501370
08	January 5, 1982	978-4091501387
09	April 5, 1982	978-4091501394
10	August 5, 1982	978-4091501400
11	November 5, 1982	978-4091503312
12	April 5, 1983	978-4091503329
13	August 5, 1983	978-4091503336
14	December 5, 1983	978-4091503343
15	May 5, 1984	978-4091503350
16	September 5, 1984	978-4091503367
17	December 5, 1984	978-4091503374
18	April 5, 1985	978-4091503381
19	July 5, 1985	978-4091503398
20	October 5, 1985	978-4091503404
21	January 5, 1986	978-4091506115
22	August 5, 1986	978-4091506122
23	September 5, 1986	978-4091506139

- Shogakukan (Shonen Big Comics Wide-ban, 1979–1986)

Vol.	Japanese release date	Japanese ISBN
01	April 16, 1992	978-4091237118
02	June 16, 1992	978-4091237125
03	August 8, 1992	978-4091237132
04	October 1992	978-4091237149
05	December 12, 1992	978-4091237156
06	February 16, 1993	978-4091237163
07	April 1993	9784091237170
08	June 16, 1993	978-4091237187
09	August 9, 1993	9784091237194
10	October 16, 1993	9784091237200

- Scola (Scola Manga Bunko, 1994)

Vol.	Japanese release date	Japanese ISBN
01	September 1994	978-4796201940
02	September 1994	978-4796201957
03	September 1994	978-4796201964
04	September 1994	978-4796201971
05	September 1994	978-4796201988
06	September 1994	978-4796201995
07	September 1994	978-4796202008
08	November 1994	978-4796202312
09	November 1994	978-4796202329
10	November 1994	9784796202336
11	November 1994	978-4796202343
12	November 1994	978-4796202350
13	November 1994	978-4796202367

- Media Factory (MF Bunko, 1999–2000)

Vol.	Japanese release date	Japanese ISBN
01	November 1999	978-4889919585
02	November 1999	978-4889919592
03	November 1999	978-4889919608
04	November 1999	978-4889919615
05	December 1999	978-4889919875
06	December 1999	978-4889919882
07	December 1999	978-4889919899
08	January 2000	978-4840100113
09	January 2000	978-4840100120
10	January 2000	978-4840100137
11	February 2000	978-4840100328
12	February 2000	978-4840100335
13	February 2000	978-4840100342

- Kadokawa/Media Factory (MF Comics, 2003–2004)

Vol.	Japanese release date	Japanese ISBN
01	September 30, 2003	978-4889919585
02	September 30, 2003	978-4040682495
03	October 23, 2003	978-4040685014
04	October 23, 2003	978-4040685021
05	November 22, 2003	978-4040685038
06	November 22, 2003	978-4040685045
07	December 22, 2003	978-4040685212
08	December 22, 2003	978-4040685229
09	January 23, 2004	978-4040685236
10	January 23, 2004	978-4040685243
11	February 23, 2004	978-4040685571
12	February 23, 2004	978-4040685588
13	March 23, 2004	978-4040685595

=== OVA films ===
Area 88: Original OVA Series

Between February 5, 1985, and August 15, 1986, Studio Pierrot produced a direct-to-video animated film trilogy for VHS and laserdisc. In 1992, Central Park Media's U.S. Manga Corps released the OVA series, subtitled in English, in North America for VHS and laserdisc, and re-released the first volume for DVD on 14 July 2000.

After Central Park Media's films license lapsed, ADV Films published a two episode theatrical edit of the OVA trilogy for DVD on 25 July 2006. Although having one less episode, the episodes themselves are longer. They have been reedited so that act II is divided and added onto the first and the last episode respectively. As such, nothing is actually missing from the ADV collection, despite having a smaller episode count. The 2006 ADV collection is a two-DVD set, and features the original Japanese soundtrack as well as the dubbed English track, performed by the same cast who voiced the English dub of the TV series. The DVD content also includes an interview with Kaoru Shintani, and an introduction to the fighter jets portrayed in the series.

Discotek Media re-released the OVA series on October 30, 2018.

==== Media ====
- Area 88: Act I: Blue Skies of Betrayal (1985, VHS/LD; 1992, VHS; July 14, 2000, DVD)
- Area 88: Act II: The Requirements of Wolves (1985, VHS/LD; 1992, VHS)
- Area 88: Act III: Burning Mirage (1986, VHS/LD; 1992, VHS)
- Area 88: Original OVA Series (July 25, 2006, DVD)

=== Anime television ===
An updated 12-episode anime television series with CG graphics, produced by TV Asahi, Animax, Group TAC and Media Factory, began production in 2003 and premiered across Japan on TV Asahi and the anime satellite television network, Animax from 8 January 2004 to 5 March 2004, which later aired the series across its other respective networks worldwide, including Hong Kong, Southeast Asia, South Asia, South Korea, Taiwan, and other regions. The series featured the work of several prominent contemporary trance music artists during combat scenes, such as Rank 1, DJ Tiësto, and Svenson & Gielen; official materials called these scenes the "highlight of the work". ADV Films licensed the series for North American distribution, releasing the series across the region, with the first DVD volume release being published on June 22, 2005 and the last volume being released on January 17, 2006. The DVD release notably removed the licensed trance music, replacing it with a handful of original compositions by Miyake Kazunori reused across the series. For the release of the English dub to English-speaking countries, the ADR team at ADV Films sought the assistance of Capt. Kevin "Dumpster" Divers, a USAF officer, to ensure that dialogue had proper Air Force jargon.

=== Video games ===
A shoot 'em up video game by Capcom was released in the arcades in 1989. It was released in the West as UN Squadron. Ports were released for the Amiga, Amstrad CPC, Atari ST, Commodore 64, Super NES and ZX Spectrum.

In the game, the player could choose either Shin, Mickey, or Greg as the pilot to play. Each came with a different plane and various advantages; for example, Mickey could handle air-to-air dogfights well while Greg excelled at air-to-ground attacks. Each pilot also had special abilities; Shin mastered normal weaponry at the highest speed, Mickey inflicted extra damage with his armaments, and Greg recovered from attacks almost before they occurred. The Super NES release offered six fighter planes, with the F-8 Crusader as the default aircraft. The game also included various elements from the series, such as the land carrier.

In 1995, Family Soft produced two Area 88 games for the PC-9801.

An October 2014 crossover event took place in Ace Combat Infinity where aircraft and emblems used by the main characters of Area 88 were added to the game. These included Shin's F-5 and F-20, Mickey's F-14, Greg's A-10, and Kim's AV-8.

=== Board game ===
Two special board games based on the franchise were released in the 1980s, but as so-called "Coterie" games, which are preordered editions and only go on limited sale at Japan's Game Market trade show. With mechanics based on the GDW board game Imperium, the Area 88 in Desert War and Peace in the Aslan Kingdom have the game counters, instructions and battle map (a fictional representation of the Sinai Peninsula) printed in standard bond paper, with players left to cut up the counters and attach them and the map in cardstock.

=== Toys/model kits ===
A line of Area 88 model kits was also produced, which are basically aircraft that are painted as they appeared in the series. Takara released a 1/100 line of aircraft kits, each with a 1/24 pilot figure in the early 1980s to coincide with the original manga stories. Kits included Shin's Crusader, F-5G Tiger II and F-20 Tigershark, Mickey's F-100 and F-14, Saki's Kfir, Greg's A-10, and two planes from the Counter-Governmental Air Force—a Yak-36 Forger and a MiG-27 Flogger-D.

The first release of 1/144 kits by Hasegawa in the early 1990s consisted of Mickey's F-14, Shin's F-8 and F-5, Seilane Balnock's Harrier, and Saki Vashtar's Kfir. Each kit had a 1/12 scale figure of the pilot in resin while the 1/144 plane kits were styrene plastic tooled up by Dragon models in Hong Kong. The third wave, released by Hasegawa in 1996, featured 1/72 kits of the same jets, but this time Hasegawa's own kit moldings were used. They comprised Saki's Kfir, Gregg's A-10, Shin's F-8, F-20, X-29 and Draken, and Mickey's F-14. Hasegawa also produced a 1/48 two-pack set in line with the 2004 TV series, consisting of Shin's F-8 and Mickey's F-14, plus a DVD.

From January 2004 to December 2005, trading figure company The Other Corp released a line of 1/144 gashapon miniatures of various modern military aircraft that are painted as according to their actual appearance in the series, despite one of the offerings—the Su-47 Berkut—never having appeared at all.

== Soundtracks ==
- Area 88 Opening Theme: Mission - Fuga

Area 88: Sound File 1 (Released March 17, 2004) - Track listing
No.	Title	Length
1.	"Mission (FUGA) (TV size)"
2.	"Awakening"
3.	"Dawn"
4.	"Frontier Land"
5.	"Dry"
6.	"Fight"
7.	"Tension"
8.	"The Anthem 2003"
9.	"Desert Night"
10.	"Desert Star"
11.	"Desert Sun"
12.	"Desert Sunset"
13.	"True Makoto"
14.	"Loneliness"
15.	"Ambition"
16.	"Convocation"
17.	"Strategy Meeting"
18.	"Sortie"
19.	"Out of the Blue (Mauro Picotto Remix)"
20.	"Flowers of One Wheel"
21.	"Heart Shaking"
22.	"Tenshi"
23.	"Speed of Sound"
24.	"Bombed"
25.	"Counterattack"
26.	"Symsonic (Vocal Mix)"
27.	"Ryoko"
28.	"Smile"
29.	"Warm"
30.	"Wrapped"
31.	"Far"
32.	"Sun Also Rises"
33.	"Wings"
34.	"Angels Theme (G-Aria) (TV size)"
35.	"Dance in the Battlefield (TV size)"

Area 88: Sound File 2 (Released March 17, 2004) - Track listing
No.	Title	Length
1.	"Plot"
2.	"Ambition"
3.	"Destiny"
4.	"Trap"
5.	"Good Job"
6.	"Dancer"
7.	"On the Move (DuMonde Remix)"
8.	"Dogfight"
9.	"Temptation"
10.	"A Hell on Earth"
11.	"Stand By"
12.	"Lock On"
13.	"Spread Your Wings"
14.	"Step By Step"
15.	"Sin"
16.	"Solstice"
17.	"Ryoko #1"
18.	"Ryoko #2"
19.	"Ryoko #3"
20.	"Memories"
21.	"Peace"
22.	"Serenity"
23.	"Light"
24.	"We Know What You Did"
25.	"True Sin"
26.	"Dance in the Battlefield (English Version)"

Area 88: Mission Cyber Trance (Released March 25, 2004) - Track listing
No.	Title	Length
1.	"Mission (FUGA) (Original Extended Mix)"
2.	"Awakening"
3.	"The Anthem 2003"
4.	"Out of the Blue (Mauro Picotto Remix)"
5.	"Symsonic (Vocal Mix)"
6.	"Tenshi"
7.	"Traffic"
8.	"Temptation"
9.	"Angels Theme (G-Aria) (Wippenberg Dub)"
10.	"Solstice"
11.	"We Know What You Did"
12.	"Obsession"
13.	"On the Move (DuMonde Remix)"
14.	"Spread Your Wings"
15.	"Mission (FUGA) (Rock in Heaven Mix)"
16.	"Angels Theme (G-Aria) (Cyber Trance Mix)"

== Reception ==
In Issue 5 of Gateways, Jeffrey Gomez noted "Kaoru Shintani's Area 88 is perhaps the most immediately striking of the manga currently available ... Using breathtaking black and white visuals which combine cartoon art with super-realistic drawings of high tech bombers, Shintani clearly shows us that there is little choice for any of his characters."

In Issue 83 of Space Gamer/Fantasy Gamer, Martin A. Stever commented that "The art is impressive, especially the ability to render moving jet aircraft. True to real war, characters are killed with regularity but not without remorse." Stever

Anime News Network praised Area 88's English dub released by ADV, especially with most of it done with the assistance of a consultant from the US Air Force. Freetype gave the series a 7.0 out of 10, citing "Intense, fast, adrenaline-pumping dogfight action", while criticizing it for being one-dimensional for lack of some character development, lack of emphasis on action with the morals and drama watered down.
