= Strain (manga) =

Japanese manga series

- First tankōbon volume cover

ストレイン (Sutorain)
- Genre: Crime drama
- Manga
- Written by: Buronson
- Illustrated by: Ryoichi Ikegami
- Published by: Shogakukan
- English publisher: NA: Viz Media
- Magazine: Big Comic Superior
- English magazine: NA: Pulp
- Original run: 1996 – 1998
- Volumes: 5
- icon

Strain (Japanese: ストレイン, Hepburn: Sutorain) is a Japanese manga series written by Buronson and illustrated by Ryoichi Ikegami. It was serialized in Shogakukan's seinen manga magazine Big Comic Superior from 1996 to 1998, with its chapters collected in five tankōbon volumes. It was licensed in North America by Viz Media and serialized in Pulp from 1997 to 2000, while the five collected volumes were released from 1999 to 2002.

== Plot ==
Mayo is a professional assassin who is hired by the "Organization" to kill the mother of a young prostitute, Shion. Shion pleads with Mayo, and convinces him to give up on his mission. As Mayo takes pity on Shion and her mother, who offer him more money, the leaders of the Organization pronounce a death sentence on him.

== Publication ==
Written by Buronson and illustrated by Ryoichi Ikegami, Strain was serialized in Shogakukan's seinen manga magazine Big Comic Superior from 1996 to 1998. Shogakukan collected its chapters in five tankōbon volumes, released from June 30, 1997, to September 30, 1998.

In North America, the manga was licensed for English release by Viz Media. It was published in their Pulp manga magazine from the December 1997 to the February 2001 issue. The five collected volumes were released from January 5, 1999, to January 9, 2002.

=== Volumes ===
No.	Original release date	Original ISBN	English release date	English ISBN
1	June 30, 1997	4-09-184531-2	January 5, 1999	1-56931-319-9
2	October 30, 1997	4-09-184532-0	January 5, 2000	1-56931-381-4
3	February 26, 1998	4-09-184533-9	April 1, 2000	1-56931-469-1
4	July 30, 1998	4-09-184534-7	May 6, 2001	1-56931-541-8
5	September 30, 1998	4-09-184535-5	January 9, 2002	1-56931-682-1
