= Wounded Man =

Manga by Kazuo Koike and Ryoichi Ikegami

- First tankōbon volume cover

傷追い人 (Kizuoibito)
- Manga
- Written by: Kazuo Koike
- Illustrated by: Ryoichi Ikegami
- Published by: Shogakukan
- English publisher: NA: ComicsOne
- Magazine: Big Comic Spirits
- Original run: 1982 – 1986
- Volumes: 11
- Original video animation
- Directed by: Toshio Takeuchi; Satoshi Dezaki
- Written by: Kazumi Koide
- Music by: Norimasa Yamanaka
- Studio: Madhouse (#1); Magic Bus (#2–5)
- Released: July 5, 1986 – August 25, 1988
- Episodes: 5
- icon

Wounded Man (Japanese: 傷追い人, Hepburn: Kizuoibito) is a Japanese manga series written by Kazuo Koike and illustrated by Ryoichi Ikegami. It was serialized in Shogakukan's seinen manga magazine Big Comic Spirits from 1982 to 1986. A five-episode original video animation (OVA) adaptation produced by Madhouse and Magic Bus and directed by Toshio Takeuchi was released from July 1986 to August 1988.

== Media ==
=== Manga ===
Written by Kazuo Koike and illustrated by Ryoichi Ikegami, Wounded Man was serialized in Shogakukan's seinen manga magazine Big Comic Spirits from 1982 to 1986. Shogakukan collected its chapters in eleven tankōbon volumes.

ComicsOne published the manga in English in 9 volumes.

=== OVA ===
A 5-episode original video animation (OVA) adaptation, produced by Madhouse and Magic Bus, was released from July 5, 1986, to August 25, 1988. It was directed by Yoshio Takeuchi (first episode) and Satoshi Dezaki (episodes 2–5), written by Kazumi Koide and the music was composed by Norimasa Yamanaka.
