= Mount Nisir =

Mountain mentioned in the Epic of Gilgamesh

Coordinates: 35.77306°N 45.229361°E

Mount Nisir (also spelled Mount Niṣir, and also called Mount Nimush), mentioned in the ancient Mesopotamian Epic of Gilgamesh, is supposedly the mountain known today as Pir Omar Gudrun or Pira Magrun (Kurdish: چیای پیرەمەگروون, Arabic: جبل بيرة مكرون), elevation 2,588 m (8490 ft.), near the city Sulaymaniyah in Iraqi Kurdistan. The name may mean "Mount of Salvation".

According to the Epic of Gilgamesh, Mt. Nisir is the resting place of the ship built by Utnapishtim. Despite the precise descriptions in the Epic of Gilgamesh, those curious have never attempted to search for the remains of the giant ship on Mount Nisir.

An alternative translation of "Mount Nisir" in the Epic of Gilgamesh XI,141a is based on the ambiguous words: "KUR-ú ^{KUR} ni-sir held tight the boat." The Sumerian word KUR can mean land or country or hill, but not mountain. In Akkadian, KUR with the phonetic complement -ú is read as shadû which can mean hill or mountain. The second KUR is a determinative indicating that nisir is the name of a hill or land or country (or in Akkadian a mountain). But Thompson read this determinative as matu, an Akkadian word for country. The country Nisir may have got its name from nisirtu which means a locality that is hidden, inaccessible, or secluded. Hence the boat may have grounded on an inaccessible hill.
