= Japan (1992 manga) =

Japanese manga series

- Volume cover

ジャパン
- Genre: Adventure; Post-apocalyptic
- Manga
- Written by: Buronson
- Illustrated by: Kentaro Miura
- Published by: Hakusensha
- English publisher: NA: Dark Horse Comics
- Imprint: Jets Comics
- Magazine: Young Animal
- Published: 1992
- Volumes: 1
- icon

Japan (ジャパン) is a Japanese manga written by Buronson and illustrated by Kentaro Miura. It was published in Hakusensha's seinen manga magazine Young Animal in 1992. In North America, it was licensed in English by Dark Horse Comics.

== Plot ==
A yakuza, deeply enamored with a television reporter, follows her to Barcelona, Spain, where she is producing a segment on foreign perceptions of the Japanese people and their self-image. During her presentation, she draws a historical parallel between modern Japan and ancient Carthage, arguing that the Carthaginians were annihilated by the Romans due to a similar cultural mindset—one that prioritizes economic dominance over military strength, ultimately leading to defeat. Suddenly, an earthquake strikes, and the group—comprising the yakuza, the reporter, and several university students—is transported into the future by the spirits of Carthaginians.

In this dystopian era, rising sea levels have submerged the Japanese archipelago, forcing its people to disperse across the globe. Many have settled in Europe, now under a repressive dictatorship, where they face persecution and enslavement. With Japan erased and its people oppressed, the yakuza, driven by his devotion to the reporter, envisions a resurgence: he believes that if the scattered Japanese unite and resist, they may reclaim their homeland.

== Publication ==
Written by Buronson and illustrated by Kentaro Miura, Japan was serialized in Hakusensha's seinen manga magazine Young Animal in 1992. Hakusensha collected its chapters in a single tankōbon volume, released on November 27, 1992. A bunkoban edition volume was released on June 12, 1998. In North America, the manga was licensed by Dark Horse Comics. The volume was published on August 24, 2005.

== Reception ==
In Manga: The Complete Guide, Jason Thompson gave Japan two out of four stars, characterizing it as a "nationalist fantasy" that alternates between combat-heavy sequences and philosophical reflections on Japanese identity. He commented that Miura's artwork stands out for its visceral "sense of weight and impact".
