= Manga artist =

People (artists) who create manga

A manga artist, also known as a mangaka, (Note: /ˈmɔːŋɡəkə, ˈmæŋ-/, MAWNG-gə-kə, MANG-; Japanese: 漫画家) is a comic artist who writes and/or illustrates manga.

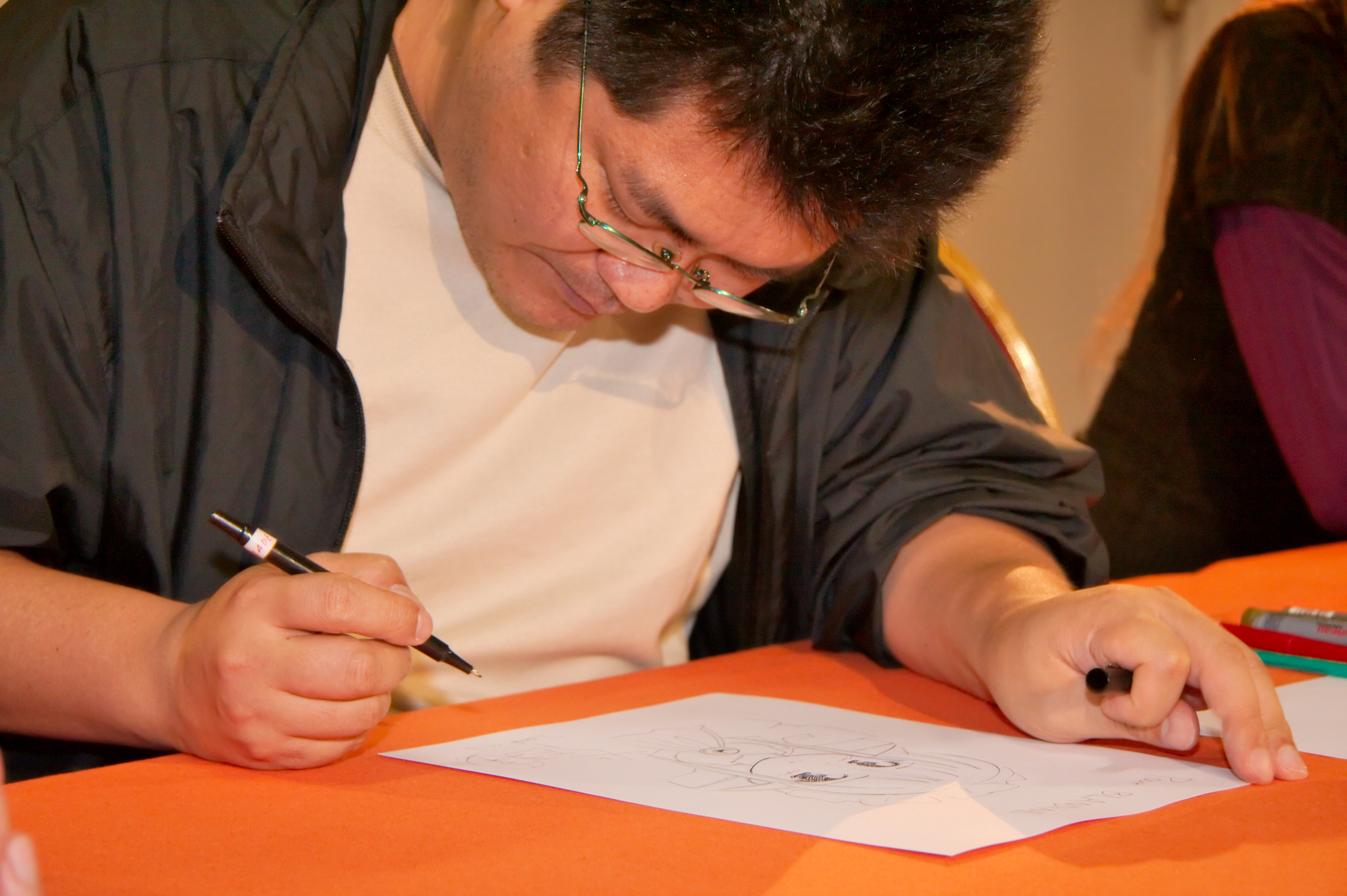
Bow Ditama, a manga artist

Most manga artists study at an art college or manga school or take on an apprenticeship with another artist before entering the industry as a primary creator. More rarely a manga artist breaks into the industry directly, without previously being an assistant. For example, Naoko Takeuchi, author of Sailor Moon, won a Kodansha Manga Award contest and manga pioneer Osamu Tezuka was first published while studying an unrelated degree, without working as an assistant.

A manga artist rises to prominence through recognition of their ability when they spark the interest of institutions, individuals or a demographic of manga consumers. For example, there are contests sponsored by manga editors and publishers. This can also be accomplished through producing a one-shot. While sometimes a stand-alone manga, with enough positive reception it can be serialized in a weekly, monthly, or quarterly format. They are also recognized for the number of manga they run at any given moment.

== Etymology ==
The original Japanese word can be broken down into two parts: manga (漫画) and ka (家).

The manga corresponds to the medium of art the artist uses: comics, or Japanese comics, depending on how the term is used inside or outside Japan.

The -ka (家) suffix implies a degree of expertise and traditional authorship. For example, the term mangaka would not be applied to a writer creating a story which is then handed over to a manga artist for drawing. The Japanese term for such a writer of comics is gensakusha (原作者).

In 2009, 5,300 mangaka were honored with a title published in bound volume in Japan. In a 2010 message, Japan Cartoonists Association chairman, Takashi Yanase says: "[w]hile Japan is often said to be the world's cartoon kingdom, not a few people will surely be wondering what exactly the Japanese mean by the term 'cartoon'. Unfortunately, there is no hard-and-fast definition that can be offered, since the members of this association lay claim to an extensive variety of works."

== Becoming a manga artist ==
Traditionally, in order to become a manga artist, one would need to send their work into a competition held by various publishing companies. If they won their work would be published and they would be assigned an editor and officially "debut" as a manga artist. Nowadays there are many self-published manga artists on the internet posting their work on websites. It is possible for these manga artists' works to be officially picked up by a publishing company, such as Shueisha. For example, One-Punch Man started off as a webcomic before Shueisha began publishing a manga remake on Tonari No Young Jump.

== Relationship to other staff ==
While Japan does have an independent comic market for amateur and semi-professional artists, creating manga professionally is rarely done alone. Manga artists must work with an assortment of others to get their work completed, published, and into the hands of readers.

=== Editor ===
Professional Mangakas usually work along an Editor, who is viewed as the supervisor of the manga artist and supervises series production. The editor gives advice on the layout and art of the manga, vets the story direction and pace, ensures that deadlines are met, and makes sure that the manga stays up to company standards. Naoki Urasawa compared the relationship between a manga artist and their editor to that of the one between a music producer and a recording artist, specifically citing George Martin's relationship with The Beatles. The editor may also function as a brand manager and publicist for a series. When a manga is the basis for a media franchise, the editor may also supervise the designs for anime adaptations, and similar products, though this duty may also fall to the manga artist or an agent. An example of a manga artist and their editor is Akira Toriyama and Kazuhiko Torishima.

=== Writer ===
A manga artist may both write and illustrate a series of their own creation, or may work together with an author. The manga artist typically has a strong influence on dialog even when paired with a writer, as any conversation must fit within the physical constraints of the artwork. Takeshi Obata of Death Note, Tetsuo Hara of Fist of the North Star, and Ryoichi Ikegami of Sanctuary are all successful manga artists who have worked with writers through the majority of their careers.

=== Assistants ===
Most manga artists have assistants who help them complete their work in a clean and timely manner. The duties of assistants vary widely, as the term incorporates all people working for a manga artist's art studio, but is most commonly used to refer to secondary artists. The number of assistant artists also varies widely between manga artists, but is typically at least three. Other manga artists instead form work groups known as "circles" but do not use additional assistants, such as the creative team CLAMP. A few manga artists have no assistants at all, and prefer to do everything themselves, but this is considered exceptional.

Assistants are commonly used for inking, lettering, and shading, though the predominance of black and white art in manga means that, unlike in the western comic industry, a studio rarely employs a colorist. Some manga artists only do the sketchwork for their art, and have their numerous assistants fill in all of the details, but it is more common for assistants to deal with background and cameo art, leaving the manga artist to focus on drawing and inking the characters. Assistants may also be employed to perform specialized artistic tasks. Go Nagai, for instance, at one time employed a specialist to draw helicopters and other military vehicles, Kaoru Mori employed a historical consultant for Emma, and series that incorporates photorealistic architecture, animals, computer-rendered imagery, or other technically demanding effects may employ or contract separate artists trained in those techniques. Assistants almost never help the manga artist with the plot of their manga, beyond being a sounding board for ideas. A manga artist's assistants might be listed in the credits for a manga tankōbon, and short interviews with or illustrations by assistant artists are a common form of bonus material in these collections, but they typically do not receive individual credits.

Most manga artists started out as assistants, such as Miwa Ueda to Naoko Takeuchi, Leiji Matsumoto to Osamu Tezuka, Kaoru Shintani to Leiji Matsumoto, and Eiichiro Oda, Hiroyuki Takei and Mikio Itō to Nobuhiro Watsuki, who was himself an assistant to Takeshi Obata. It is also possible for an assistant to have an entire career as such without becoming an independent manga artist. Assistants, particularly specialists, may work with several different manga artists at the same time, and many assistants also self-publish works of their own in the dōjinshi scene.

== See also ==
- Bakuman, a late 2000s manga series offering a dramatized look at the inside of the industry
- The Comic Artist and His Assistants, a manga that offers a dramatized perspective view of life as a manga artist
- List of manga artists
