= Sanctuary (manga) =

Japanese manga series

- Cover of the first manga volume

サンクチュアリ (Sankuchuari)
- Genre: Political thriller
- Manga
- Written by: Sho Fumimura
- Illustrated by: Ryoichi Ikegami
- Published by: Shogakukan
- English publisher: NA: Viz Media
- Magazine: Big Comic Superior
- Original run: 1990 – 1995
- Volumes: 12
- Live-action film
- Directed by: Yukio Fuji
- Written by: Kanji Yasumoto
- Released: January 21, 1995
- Runtime: 103 minutes
- Live-action film

Sanctuary Part 2
- Directed by: Haruaki Yoshino
- Written by: Tetsutomo Kosugi
- Music by: Torsten Rasch
- Studio: Video Champ
- Released: December 18, 1995
- Runtime: 80 minutes
- Live-action film

Sanctuary Part 3
- Directed by: Haruaki Yoshino
- Written by: Junichi Suzuki
- Music by: Torsten Rasch
- Studio: Video Champ
- Released: February 25, 1996
- Runtime: 82 minutes
- Original video animation
- Directed by: Takashi Watanabe
- Produced by: Masamichi Fujiwara; Umeo Itō; Kōichirō Inomata
- Written by: Kenji Terada
- Studio: Pastel
- Licensed by: NA: Viz Media
- Released: May 1, 1996
- Runtime: 50 minutes
- icon

Sanctuary (Japanese: サンクチュアリ, Hepburn: Sankuchuari) is a manga written by Sho Fumimura, and illustrated by Ryoichi Ikegami. It was serialized in Shogakukan's seinen manga magazine Big Comic Superior from 1990 to 1995, with its chapters collected in 12 volumes. It was published as 46 comic books and collected as nine volumes in America by Viz Graphics from 1995 to 1997. Sanctuary was a bestseller in Japan, and inspired an original video animation and a series of live-action films.

== Plot ==
Sanctuary is a story that featured two childhood friends, Akira Hojo and Chiaki Asami, who ruthlessly struggle to set a new paradigm of living in Japan. However, the two friends take radically different paths (playing rock-paper-scissors to decide their roles): Akira chooses the dark path and joins a yakuza gang, while Chiaki strives to become the youngest member of the Japanese Diet. As survivors of the Cambodian killing fields, the two characters develop an unmatched aggression and survival instincts, helping them to achieve their common ultimate goal: making Japan their own sanctuary.

The story starts with Hojo as a minor mob boss and Asami as a political advisor. The plot first focuses on their rise to positions of greater power. Hojo's rise is decidedly quicker than Asami's, whose struggle to get to the top lasts the entire manga. Hojo is a yakuza don by book 2. The story then follows his attempts to gain control over the entire yakuza while secretly paving the way for them to become a legitimate enterprise. Asami, meanwhile, must try to enter the Diet by forming his own party that represents the younger people of Japan. He is constantly opposed by the current Dietmen, who are aging politicians intent on holding onto power (often considered to be a thinly veiled reference to the Liberal Democratic Party).

By the end of the series, both Hojo and Asami succeed in their ambitions. Hojo successfully unites all of the major yakuza syndicates under his banner to extend the longevity of yakuza (through educational reform) while Asami successfully becomes the youngest nominated politician to become Prime Minister of Japan. At the end of their journey, they return to where it all began: Cambodia. Unfortunately, Asami dies due to illness.

== Characters ==
Akira Hojo (北条彰, Hōjō Akira)
Voiced by: Shō Hayami (Japanese); David Kaye (English)
Portrayed by: Toshiya Nakasawa
Don of the Sagara Alliance (相楽連合, Sagara Rengō). Asami's childhood friend, he is heading towards domination over Japan's yakuza corporations. By the end of the story, Hojo runs for the Diet.
Chiaki Asami (浅見千秋, Asami Chiaki)
Voiced by: Kazuhiro Nakata (Japanese); Paul Dobson (English)
Portrayed by: Hiroshi Abe
Ambitious and strong-willed politician. He lived in Cambodia with Hojo's family in the 1970s. Asami's personal nemesis is Isaoka.
Norimoto Isaoka (伊佐岡紀元, Isaoka Norimoto)
Voiced by: Takeshi Watabe
An "old fox" with all the connections one can imagine at every economic, politic and illegal level possible. He served a prison sentence in Sugamo Prison after World War II.
Tokai (渡海)
Voiced by: Takaya Hashi (Japanese); Scott McNeil (English)
Hojo's former mentor, a through-and-through yakuza who serves his boss efficiently, with an unshakeable loyalty.
Reiji Tashiro (田代怜二, Tashiro Reiji)
Voiced by: Tomokazu Seki (Japanese); Brian Drummond (English)
Portrayed by: Toshihiko Sakakibara
Young assistant of Hojo, who saved his new-born baby years ago. As with Tokai, he would give his life for his boss.
Kyoko Ishihara (石原杏子, Ishihara Kyōko)
Voiced by: Hiromi Tsuru (Japanese); Nicole Oliver (English)
Portrayed by: Azusa Nakamura
Deputy-chief in the district of Tokyo. Born in 1965 (vol.1 chap. 2) she is 27 at the time of the story. Went to Tokyo University. Kyoko later falls for Hojo and the feelings are mutual.
Ozaki (尾崎)
Voiced by: Unshō Ishizuka (Japanese); Ward Perry (English)
Portrayed by: Naomasa Musaka
Subaltern of Ishihara, he knows Tokai very well, but he's a good policeman nonetheless.
Besitt (ビセット, Bisetto)
The Trade Minister of the U.S. who falls for Asami and becomes a loyal foreign ally.
Yuki
Asami's lover, a university student.
Murata (村田)
Hojo's advisor in the yakuza.
Wong Chi-Yeung (黄志陽, Kō Shiyō; Chinese Mandarin: Huáng Zhìyáng, Jyutping: wong4 zi3 joeng4)
A Hong Kong Don who at first double crosses Hojo and Asami before later aiding them again.
Masanobu Miyamura (宮村政信, Miyamura Masanobu)
A Don who owes Hojo his life.
Ibuki
A Don from Kobe and ally of Hojo.
Shinichiro Sengoku (仙石慎一郎, Sengoku Shin'ichirō)
The son of an old school politician who is both a trouble maker and playboy. He does everything he can to avenge his father's death and joins forces with Asami.
Kisuke Nakagusuku (中城規介, Nakagusuku Kisuke)
Leader of the Okinawan mafia.

== Media ==
=== Manga ===
Viz Media's English release was translated by cultural anthropologist Rachel Thorn. It was nominated for the 1995 Harvey Award for Best American Edition of Foreign Material.

==== Volumes ====
No.	Japanese release date	Japanese ISBN
1	October 30, 1990	4-09-182361-0
2	April 27, 1991	4-09-182362-9
3	July 30, 1991	4-09-182363-7
4	February 29, 1992	4-09-182364-5
5	August 29, 1992	4-09-182365-3
6	March 30, 1993	4-09-182366-1
7	September 30, 1993	4-09-182367-X
8	January 29, 1994	4-09-182368-8
9	May 30, 1994	4-09-182369-6
10	August 30, 1994	4-09-182370-X
11	January 30, 1995	4-09-183531-7
12	April 27, 1995	4-09-183532-5

=== Adaptations ===
Sanctuary was adapted in both a one-shot anime original video animation (OVA), and live-action theatrical release. Both versions were released in North America by Viz Media.
