= Sword of the Berserk: Guts' Rage =

1999 video game

- Developer: Yuke's
- Publishers: JP: ASCII Corporation; WW: Eidos Interactive
- Director: Yoshio Togiya
- Programmers: Tatsuhiko Sugimoto; Hiroki Ueno; Takanori Yoshioka
- Artist: Kentarō Miura (character)
- Writers: Kentarō Miura; Tsuyoshi Tamai
- Composer: Susumu Hirasawa
- Series: Berserk
- Platform: Dreamcast
- Release: JP: December 16, 1999; NA: March 15, 2000; EU: May 19, 2000
- Genres: Action, hack and slash
- Mode: Single-player

Sword of the Berserk: Guts' Rage, released in Japan as Berserk Millennium Falcon Arc: Chapter of the Flowers of Oblivion (ベルセルク 千年帝国の鷹篇 喪失花の章, Beruseruku Sennen Teikoku No Taka Hen Wasurebana no Shō), is a 1999 hack and slash video game for the Dreamcast. It is based on the popular Berserk manga by Kentarō Miura and the game is set between volume 22 and 23 of the manga; right after Guts and Puck depart for Elfhelm with Casca (chapter 182), but before Farnese, Serpico, and Isidro catch up with them (chapter 190). The music is composed by Susumu Hirasawa, who also composed the anime series' music.

Released around the same time as Shenmue, Sword of the Berserk is notable for its early use of quick time events (QTE). It used these to determine the different non-linear paths the player would take, depending on whether they succeed or fail in pressing the displayed button quickly enough during a QTE, allowing different ways to complete the game.

== Synopsis ==
After saving a traveling performer named Rita from bandits while on their way to Elfhelm, Guts, Casca, and Puck come to a small castle town to rest. Upon arriving, they learn of a disease that transforms its victims into "Mandragorans", making them go berserk and kill people, even their loved ones, without thinking. The ruler of the castle, Baron Balzac, learns of Guts killing a Mandragoran and brings him to the dungeon where people infected with the disease are kept. Balzac brings Guts to his laboratory while explaining that he is searching for a supposed cure. Guts learns from Balzac that the disease comes from an unusual plant, the Mandragora that grew into a tree located in a nearby village on the borders of his domain. After meeting a group of rebels that abducted Casca and learning the baron is a tyrant to their people, Guts decides to carry out Balzac's request for the Great Tree's heart since the baron's findings might provide a cure for Casca's madness. But while Guts is joined by Rita and a group of rebels, Balzac's men raid the rebels' hideout and capture Casca.

Losing their traveling companions while Guts confronts the Mandragorans' matriarch Erica, who maintained her free will to protect the Mandragora that grew from the remains of a boy named Niko, he and Rita find Balzac's men slaughtering the Mandragorans. Erica, upon seeing the utopia she created destroyed, chooses to destroy herself and the Mandragora Heart rather than hand the latter over with only the pendant she made from Niko's charm remaining as Rita picked it up. Guts was about to fight Balzac's men when Nosferatu Zodd arrives, the Apostle having freed Casca from her dungeon cell earlier, and they have a brief rematch that once more ends in a draw. By that time, encountering a young woman with a similar madness and assumed to be Balzac's daughter, Puck and Casca stumble into the chamber where the fragment of the Mandragora Heart that Balzac obtained awakens. This causes all Mandragorans to act up and run amok in the town as Guts and Rita return.

Fighting his way through the Mandragorans and Balzac's forces to reach the castle, Guts and Rita see the mysterious girl and take her with them. When they finally reach Balzac's throne room, Guts demands to know where Casca is, but Balzac only answers that they are too late to save her. Rita asks Balzac how all of these events came to pass; he recounts that he was once a kind and just ruler, but the pressure of juggling his responsibilities as both a ruler and as a husband eventually got to him, and he now finds comfort only in bloodshed. Balzac also reveals the woman to be his wife, Annette. He had preserved her life with a drug extract made from the Mandragora's Heart, making her ageless, but at a steep price – the drug also ravaged her mind, rendering her unable to remember her own husband. Despite this, in his madness, Balzac drinks an even more potent extract of the Mandragora's Heart, transforming himself into a monstrous figure. Guts quickly dispatches him, however, and saves Casca from the fully grown Mandragora. In a cruel twist of fate, Casca's exposure to the Mandragora briefly restores her sanity - with Guts forced to watch her revert to her catatonic state once more. He is given little time to mourn this turn of events, as in the confusion of battle, Rita had dropped Erica's pendant – revealed to be a Behelit – and the dying Balzac had claimed it, offering Annette's life as his sacrifice in order to be reborn as an Apostle. Guts finds himself forced into battle once more, but manages to defeat the Apostle Balzac despite his new-found powers. With the town reverting to some normalcy, Guts and his group continue their journey; Rita promising to not forget them. Some time after Guts's group leave, the Skull Knight appears in Balzac's castle and swallows Balzac's Behelit.

== Soundtrack ==
Berserk Millennium Falcon Arc: Chapter of the Flowers of Oblivion Original Game Soundtrack

Soundtrack album by Susumu Hirasawa
- Released: December 15, 1999
- Genre: Film score; ambient; electronica; progressive; symphonic rock
- Length: 42:30
- Label: Hakusensha, Marine ENTERTAINMENT MMCC-7008
- Producer: Susumu Hirasawa, Kentaro Miura

Berserk Millennium Falcon Arc: Chapter of the Flowers of Oblivion Original Game Soundtrack (ベルセルク 千年帝国の鷹篇 喪失花の章 Original Game Soundtrack, Beruseruku Sennnen Teikoku No Taka Hen Wasurebana no Shō Orijinaru Gēmu Saundotorakku) marked the return of Susumu Hirasawa, composer and performer of the soundtrack of the Sword-Wind Chronicle anime. Unlike the anime's soundtrack, Hirasawa composed and performed the game's opening theme, "FORCES II", and ending theme, "INDRA". Coincidentally, Hirasawa started his career as a musician with a band called Mandrake, and they made a song called "Mandragora". Hirasawa did not make all the original material for the game, part of the soundtrack was the work of Yuke's in-house musicians Masaya Imoto and Hiromi Murakami. Besides the songs that were commercially released, 39 other tracks ripped from the game's GD-ROM have been distributed online unofficially. The first-pressing limited edition of the soundtrack included the 2000 Berserk calendar and collector stickers. The soundtrack was reissued in 2012 as part of Hirasawa's Haldyn Dome boxset. Since it is a Hirasawa release, tracks 4, 6, 7, 8 and 10, which were made by Imoto and Murakami with no involvement from Hirasawa, were omitted from it.

== Reception ==
Reception

Aggregate score
Aggregator	Score
GameRankings	74%

Review scores
Publication	Score
AllGame	3.5/5
CNET Gamecenter	7/10
Edge	3/10
Electronic Gaming Monthly	8/10 (Note: In Electronic Gaming Monthly's review of the game, one critic gave it 8/10, another gave it 7/10, and the rest gave it each a score of 8.5/10.)
EP Daily	6.5/10
Famitsu	30/40
Game Informer	(2000) 8/10 (2004) 7.5/10
GameFan	(J.W.) 92% (K.D.) 89% 72% (Note: In GameFan's viewpoint of the Japanese version, two critics gave it each a score of 73, and the other gave it 71.) (F.M.) 71%
GameRevolution	B+
GameSpot	7.8/10
GameSpy	83% (PDC) 6.5/10
IGN	(US) 8/10 (JP) 7.1/10
Next Generation	3/5

Sword of the Berserk: Guts' Rage received mostly positive reviews according to the review aggregation website GameRankings. Jeff Lundrigan of NextGen said that the game "controls reasonably well and looks fantastic – you'll get your money's worth – but the gameplay design is far from perfect, and there's too much exposition for the amount of action." In Japan, Famitsu gave it a score of 30 out of 40.

The D-Pad Destroyer of GamePro said in one review, "If you're looking for a great old-school hack'n'slash with an awesome anime-style storyline, then pop Sword of the Berserk: Guts' Rage into your Dreamcast. It's an all-out, no holds barred guts-fest that manages to engage your heart and mind just before tearing them out all over your screen." (Note: GamePro gave the game three 4.5/5 scores for graphics, control, and fun factor, and 5/5 for sound in one review.) In another GamePro review, however, Four-Eyed Dragon summed it up by saying, "In the end, Guts' Rage falls short of challenging gameplay, but the simple beat-em-up premise is at least good for a one-night rental." (Note: GamePro gave the game 4/5 for graphics, and three 3.5/5 scores for sound, control, and fun factor in another review.)
