= Susumu Hirasawa discography =

- Studio albums: 15
- Soundtrack albums: 19
- Live albums: 4
- Compilation albums: 5
- Singles: 18
- Video albums: 23
- Music videos: 9

The following is the solo discography of Susumu Hirasawa, Japanese musician and composer. Since the beginning of his professional activities in 1973, Hirasawa has produced a prolific number of recordings, with a constant stream of releases since 1978, under his own name as well as multiple bands and side projects. See Mandrake (Japanese band), P-Model and Shun (band) for more output.

== Original albums ==
Title	Album details	Oricon peak chart position
Water in Time and Space (時空の水, Jikū no Mizu)	Released: 1 September 1989; Label: Polydor K.K.; Formats: CD	—
The Ghost in Science (サイエンスの幽霊, Saiensu no Yūrei)	Released: 25 May 1990; Label: Polydor K.K.; Formats: CD	—
Virtual Rabbit	Released: 1 May 1991; Label: Polydor K.K.; Formats: CD	—
Aurora	Released: 25 February 1994; Label: Polydor K.K.; Formats: CD	98
Sim City	Released: 2 August 1995; Label: Polydor K.K.; Formats: CD	91
Siren	Released: 1 August 1996; Label: Nippon Columbia, TESLAKITE; Formats: CD	—
Technique of Relief (救済の技法, Kyūsai no Gihō)	Released: 21 August 1998; Label: Nippon Columbia, TESLAKITE; Formats: CD	—
Philosopher's Propeller (賢者のプロペラ, Kenja no Puropera)	Released: 6 October 2000; Label: Chaos Union, TESLAKITE; Formats: CD, Digital download	—
Blue Limbo	Released: 13 February 2003; Label: Chaos Union, TESLAKITE; Formats: CD	202
White Tiger Field (白虎野, Byakkoya)	Released: 2 February 2006; Label: Chaos Union, TESLAKITE; Formats: CD	171
Planet Roll Call (点呼する惑星, Tenko Suru Wakusei)	Released: 18 February 2009; Label: Chaos Union, TESLAKITE; Formats: CD	42
The Secret of The Flowers of Phenomenon (現象の花の秘密, Genshō no Hana no Himitsu)	Released: 23 November 2012; Label: Chaos Union, TESLAKITE; Formats: CD	43
The Man Climbing the Hologram (ホログラムを登る男, Horoguramu o Noboru Otoko)	Released: 18 November 2015; Label: Chaos Union, TESLAKITE; Formats: CD	32
Beacon	Released: 28 July 2021; Label: Chaos Union, TESLAKITE; Formats: CD, Digital download	12

== Mini-albums ==
Title	Release details
Root of Spirit: Charity Original Tape (魂のふる里: Charity Original Tape)	Released: 10 April 1988; Label: Self-released; Formats: Cassette Book
Hirasawa Energy Works^{[1]}	Released: 27 December 2001; Label: Chaos Union, TESLAKITE; Formats: Digital download
Susumu Hirasawa Special Ringtones (スペシャル・リングトーンズ, Supesharu Ringutōnzu)	Released: 29 June 2005; Label: Chaos Union, TESLAKITE^{[2]}; Formats: Digital download
ICE-9	Released: 30 August 2005; Label: Chaos Union, TESLAKITE; Formats: CD
Live Byakkoya BGM Choice (LIVE白虎野 BGM特選)	Released: July 2006; Label: Chaos Union, TESLAKITE; Formats: CD
Discard MP3 (廃棄MP3)	Released: 21 July 2020; Label: Chaos Union, TESLAKITE; Formats: Digital download
The Book of Phytoelectron (植物電子の本)	Released: 17 September 2024; Label: Chaos Union, TESLAKITE; Formats: CD, Digital download

- 1 The track "Ruktun or Die" was a limited-time offer, and was taken out of sale in January 2002.
- 2 Five of the seven ringtones were released by twenty2product on their website for free under the name "22p_rto01".

== Soundtracks ==
Besides the works listed below, he also contributed pieces for the anime X-Bomber (see "other projects").

Original work	Type	Release	Release details
Drama House at Night^{[1]}	radio drama	—	
National Color Trans-Am X30^{[2]}	commercial (radio)	—	
Riki Choshu and André the Giant entrances^{[3]}	live-action (wrestling matches)	New Japan Pro-Wrestling Super Fighter's Themes (新日本プロレス・スーパー・ファイターのテーマ)	Released: 1980; Label: King; Formats: LP
various	commercial	Model House Works^{[4]}	Released: May 1985; Label: Model House; Formats: CS
Calgary Hurricanes entrances^{[5]}	live-action (wrestling matches)	Hurricanes Bomb (ハリケーンズ・バム, Harikēnzu Bamu)	Released: 25 March 1986; Label: Tokuma Japan Corporation, Japan Record; Formats: LP
Satsui no Jūsō (殺意の重奏; Murderous Ensemble)^{[6]}	live-action (television film)	—	
Detonator Orgun^{[7]}	anime (OVA)	Detonator Orgun 1	Released: 25 August 1991; Label: Polydor K.K.; Formats: CD
Detonator Orgun^{[7]}	anime (OVA)	Detonator Orgun 2	Released: 25 October 1991; Label: Polydor K.K.; Formats: CD
Detonator Orgun^{[7]}	anime (OVA)	Detonator Orgun 3	Released: 25 March 1992; Label: Polydor K.K.; Formats: CD
Glory Wars^{[8]}	novel trilogy	Glory Wars	Released: 25 January 1993; Label: Polydor K.K.; Formats: CD
Tadashi Shimada's Forest Message Kamui Mintara [Akan, Hokkaidō]^{[9]}	live-action (nature/ethnographic documentary)	—	Released: 29 February 2012; Label: Chaos Union, Teslakite; Formats: CD
Sword-Wind Chronicle BERSERK	anime (TV series)	Sword-Wind Chronicle; BERSERK; Original Soundtrack	Released: 6 November 1997; Label: VAP; Formats: CD
LOST LEGEND^{[10]}	theme park stage show	LOST LEGEND; Legend of the Lost Continent; Original Sound Track	Released: 1 March 1999 (show opening) 25 April 1999; Label: Chaos Union, biosphere Records; Formats: CD
Sword of the Berserk: Guts' Rage	video game	BERSERK; Millennium Falcon Arc; Chapter of the Flowers of Oblivion; Original Game Soundtrack	Released: 15 December 1999; Label: Hakusensha, Marine ENTERTAINMENT; Formats: CD
densha^{[11]}	american animation/live-action (short film)	—	
Lagnacure Legend^{[12]}	video game	—	
loop^{[13]}	american animation/live-action (short film)	—	
Far Nation^{[14]}	video game	—	
Millennium Actress	anime (film)	Millennium Actress; Original Sound Track	Released: 6 September 2002; Label: Chaos Union, TESLAKITE; Formats: CD
AmigaOS 4^{[15]}	operating system	—	Released: April 2004; Label: Hyperion Entertainment; Formats: CD
Paranoia Agent	anime (TV series)	Paranoia Agent Original Soundtrack	Released: 12 May 2004 Japan 5 April 2005 United States; Label: Chaos Union, TESLAKITE Japan Chaos Union, Geneon Entertainment USA United States; Formats: CD
Paranoia Agent	anime (TV series)	Paranoia Agent Outtake Collection	Released: 16 May 2004; Label: Chaos Union, TESLAKITE; Formats: Digital download
IdN My Favorite Conference 2004 intro sequence^{[16]}	american animation (short film)	—	
Adobe Expert Support trade show loop^{[17]}	american animation (short film)	—	
BERSERK Millennium Falcon Arc Chapter of the Holy Demon War^{[18]}	video game	BERSERK; Millennium Falcon Arc; Chapter of the Holy Demon War; Original Soundtrack	Released: 25 November 2004; Label: VAP, ULF Records; Formats: CD
Paprika	anime (film)	"Paprika" Original Soundtrack	Released: 23 November 2006 Japan 22 February 2007 France 22 May 2007 United States; Label: Chaos Union, TESLAKITE Japan Milan Records France United States; Formats: CD, Digital Download
Dreaming Machine^{[19]}	anime (film)	—	
—	online news	Free Music for Free-Lance Journalists and Independent Media^{[20]}	Released: 24 March 2011; Label: Chaos Union, TESLAKITE; Formats: Digital download
BERSERK Golden Age Arc^{[21]}	anime (films)	BERSERK; Golden Age Arc II; Siege of Doldrey^{[22]}	Released: 5 December 2012; Label: VAP Video; Formats: DVD, BD
Berserk^{[23]}	anime (TV series)	TV Animation Berserk Original Soundtrack	Released: 30 November 2016; Label: NBCUniversal Entertainment Japan; Formats: CD
Opus	anime (film)	—	

- 1 Hirasawa only made sound effects for the show, and only worked on it for about a year.
- 2 A jingle for a radio/TV/cassette recorder combo. Performed with Yasumi Tanaka. Broadcast 1980. Never officially released.
- 3 Choshu's theme, Power Hall (パワーホール, Pawā Hōru), is credited to "Hanmyō Ibo" for writing, a play on the Japanese word for "beetle" picked by happenstance; and "Z.Z.Z." for performance. Disowned by Hirasawa. Included on multiple subsequent wrestling over the decades, Hirasawa's recording only appears on King releases. Various artists have covered the song, including Ken Ishii. André's theme is attributed to E-Project.
- 4 A collection of ten assorted commercial jingles for Shiseido, Tama-Plaza, Matsuzakaya/Kansai Yamamoto, Sony, Nestlé/Nescafé, Teijin and Marui. Six variations of a jingle for Matsuden Home Shopping by Teruo Nakano are also included. Released as a bonus for the first volume of the Moire Club newsletter.
- 5 Writing and performance are credited to "Yoshio Fukurai", a tribute to Tomokichi Fukurai. Out of the album's eleven tracks, "Furukai" is only present on the title track.
- 6 Aired once by KTV, who co-produced it with Toho, on 2 February 1987. Based on the 1974 Seiichi Morimura suspense novel of the same name. Hirasawa made its backing music, Shin'ichi Sako made the sound effects and the theme song was done by George Winston.
- 7 A month before the release of the first episode, Polydor released a "making of" tape titled Detonator Orgun 0, containing an interview with Hirasawa and clips of a press conference he participated with others in the anime's staff.
- 8 Image mini-album commissioned by Hideki Kakinuma, author of the Kadokawa Sneaker Bunko series and Detonator Orgun writer.
- 9 The first installment of Human Vision Special, a now defunct series of television documentary specials produced annually by Hokkaido Television Broadcasting. It was originally broadcast on 29 April 1992 and later re-edited for home video release (released 25 January 1993 on VHS and LaserDisc). Hirasawa appears in the TV edit paddling a canoe. The soundtrack has never had an official standalone release: The title track was originally released on Root of Spirit -Essence of Hirasawa Solo Works- and Music for Movies - Great Movie Sounds of Susumu Hirasawa compilations, while the only release of the soundtrack proper is on Disc 11 of the Haldyn Dome box set, 20 years after the documentary aired.
- 10 A "spectacle show" summer attraction at the Parque España in Shima. When it premiered, the soundtrack could be only bought from the park's gift shops.
- 11 A short movie about the JR Shinjuku Station. The soundtrack has never had an official standalone release; the only kind of sound played on the short (which bears some resemblance to Syun's "Kun Mae #4" from 1996's Kun Mae on a Calculation) was originally released on Illegal Dumping (spelt "Densha", see "other releases"), it was later released with other twenty2product collaborations and remaining tracks on Disc 16 of the Haldyn Dome box set (spelt "densha").
- 12 An Artdink PlayStation RPG. Hirasawa only composed and performed the opening theme: "The Man Who Knows the Stars" (星を知る者, Hoshi o Shiru Mono). Originally released on From Hirasawa: Solo Songs Not on CD (see "other releases"), a live performance with a new arrangement is included on the Phonon 2553 Vision DVD, a studio recording of that (named "2010 version") is included with other miscellaneous tracks on Disc 16 of the Haldyn Dome box set.
- 13 A looping presentation on alternative energy, part of the "Hirasawa Energy Works" project. The soundtrack has never had an official standalone release. The audio, recorded during a surge of "Surplus Power" (see "other releases") was originally released on Hirasawa's Phantom Notes website (named "LOOP The Sound Track β1"). It was later released with other twenty2product collaborations and remaining tracks on Disc 16 of the Haldyn Dome box set (named "loop").
- 14 MMORPG developed by Sega originally for the Dreamcast, moved to the Xbox after the discontinuation of the former console, and ultimately cancelled. The exact extent of Hirasawa's involvement is unknown; one track ("Nation-F") saw release on the Music For Movies～World of Susumu Hirasawa Soundtracks compilation.
- 15 Hirasawa only composed and performed the boot jingle: "Eastern-boot". Two additional tracks were included on the AmigaOS 4.0 CD to showcase Hirasawa's music. The jingle was later released in the FAMIGA (Japanese Amiga community involved with Hirasawa) forums and with Hirasawa's Near Future Never Come e-book.
- 16 The soundtrack has never had an official standalone release; the only kind of sound played on the short was originally released on Live Byakkoya – White Tiger Field Memorial Package (named "Bonus Spot"), it was later released with other twenty2product collaborations and remaining tracks on Disc 16 of the HALDYN DOME box set (named "IDN").
- 17 The soundtrack has never had an official standalone release.
- 18 Hirasawa only composed and performed the opening theme "Sign" and the ending theme "Sign-2", two different arrangements of the same song.
- 19 Production on the film was halted for financial and artistic reasons following the death of director Satoshi Kon. Only a few scene/song combinations were set by Kon before his death. Hirasawa made some music for the film.
- 20 A collection of various songs by Hirasawa and PEVO 1go from their careers that have been edited to serve as film score to be freely used by independent media and free-lance journalists delivering news via the Internet.
- 21 Hirasawa only composed and performed the theme song: "Aria". While there have been soundtrack releases for the films, none of them include Hirasawa's work. "Aria" was originally a single-only release; it was then included in the Ash Crow compilation 5 years later, with the single CD being discontinued.
- 22 The Japanese home video release of the film includes a live performance of "Aria" from Hirasawa's "Phonon 2555" concert tour (when that tour's DVD was released, this same performance was included, but with alternative angles overlaid on top of the version on this DVD). Video of a public appearance made by Hirasawa, the trilogy's director and voice actors of the main characters to promote the third film, The Advent, was included in its Japanese home video release.
- 23 Hirasawa only composed and performed the insert songs "Ashes" and "Ash Crow". Both were first released in Ash Crow (see "rearrangement albums").

=== Songs licensed for soundtracks ===
Year	Work	Type	Song(s) used
1985	Uchida Yoko	commercial	"Karkador" (arranged and performed by P-Model)
1986	AV Cocktail chapter 4 ⟨CVI Art⟩^{[1]}	video magazine	"Karkador" (arranged and performed by P-Model)
1992	Suntory Old Whisky	commercial	"Root of Spirit" (魂のふる里, Tamashii no Furusato)
????	Itsukushima	commercial	"Fish Song" (フィッシュ・ソング, Fisshu Songu)
2004	Paranoia Agent	anime	"Gemini 2" "1778-1985" "Kingdom"
2017	A Beautiful Star	live-action (film)	"Venus" (金星, Kinsei)^{[2]}
2017	Ruiner	video game	"Island Door (Paranesian Circle)" ((トビラ島 (パラネシアン・サークル), Tobira Shima (Paraneshian Sākuru)) "Recall"

- 1 A promotional release to commemorate the fifth anniversary of the laserdisc by Pioneer, who commissioned Australian video artist to make a video for the song to be included.
- 2 Instead of featuring any of the recordings Hirasawa made of the song, the film uses a cover sung by two of its main actors (Ryuya Wakaba and Asuka Hinoi).

=== Unidentified jingles ===
From 1983 to 1990, Hirasawa worked on various commercials. Unlike most of the soundtracks listed above, Hirasawa undertook these less out of artistic interest and more out of financial necessity. Outside of those included on Model House Works, most of these jingles have never been officially released and not precisely identified—by Hirasawa or his fanbase—but among his clients were companies like Denon, Honma Golf, Japan Tobacco, Kirin, Mazda, Mizuno, NTT, Pip Fujimoto (rearranging another musician's jingle), Rado, Snow Brand Milk Products, Tsukuda, TV Asahi, Unicharm and Volvo. After he acquired an Amiga, he took on a handful jobs making both music and CGI with Takara, Itoki and HTB. Beyond broadcast work, he also contributed to installations like the Optic Fiber Clock (located on the Bellvia mall near Chino Station, plays a unique Hirasawa song centred on bird chirps once an hour 10 times a day; originally featured karakuri puppet birds that moved in sync with the chirps), Tokai Bank automated teller machines, a closing time tune for a Shinjuku cake shop and synthesizer sound effects to make a Korakuen Amusement Park rollercoaster scary.

== Rearrangement albums ==
Title	Album details	Oricon peak chart position
Solar Ray	Released: 11 October 2001; Label: Chaos Union, TESLAKITE; Formats: CD	—
Switched-On Lotus	Released: 10 January 2004; Label: Chaos Union, TESLAKITE; Formats: CD	—
Totsu-Gen-Hen-I (突弦変異)	Released: 23 June 2010; Label: Chaos Union, TESLAKITE; Formats: CD	43
Hen-Gen-Ji-Zai (変弦自在)	Released: 10 November 2010; Label: Chaos Union, TESLAKITE; Formats: CD	44
P-0 Gazio Mix CD	Released: 8 June 2013; Label: Gazio; Formats: CD	—
Ash Crow^{[1]}	Released: 14 September 2016; Label: Chaos Union, TESLAKITE; Formats: CD	16
The 6th Formant (第6フォルマント, Dai Roku Forumanto)	Released: 21 December 2017; Label: Chaos Union, TESLAKITE; Formats: Digital download	—
Rubedo/Albedo	Released: 3 February 2023; Label: Chaos Union, TESLAKITE; Formats: Digital download	—

- 1 Also a compilation album.

== Live memorial packages ==
Collections of studio recordings of rearrangements and/or original songs made for live shows.

Title	Album details
Nano-Duplication Memorials (ナノ重複記念曲集, Nano Chōfuku Kinen Kyokushū)	Released: 12 July 2003; Label: Chaos Union, TESLAKITE; Formats: Digital download
Live Byakkoya – White Tiger Field Memorial Package (LIVE白虎野記念パッケージ, LIVE Byakkoya Kinen Pakkēji)^{[1]}	Released: 19 July 2006; Label: Chaos Union, TESLAKITE; Formats: Digital download
World Cell 2015 Memorial Package	Released: 15 January 2016; Label: Chaos Union, TESLAKITE; Formats: M∞Card, digital download
The Ninth Mandala Memorial Package Card 2017 Osaka (第9曼荼羅大阪公演メモリアル・パッケージカード)	Released: 1 September 2017; Label: Chaos Union, TESLAKITE; Formats: M∞Card
The Ninth Mandala Memorial Package Card 2017 Tokyo (第9曼荼羅大阪公演メモリアル・パッケージカード)	Released: 1 December 2017; Label: Chaos Union, TESLAKITE; Formats: M∞Card
Ethical Trek Memorial Package Card 2K20▼02 Osaka (会然TREK 2K20▼02 メモリアル・パッケージカード)	Released: 10 June 2020; Label: Chaos Union, TESLAKITE; Formats: M∞Card
Ethical Trek Memorial Package Card 2K20▲03 Osaka (会然TREK 2K20▲03 メモリアル・パッケージカード)	Released: 10 November 2020; Label: Chaos Union, TESLAKITE; Formats: M∞Card
Ethical Trek Memorial Package Card 2K20▼04 Ghost Venue (会然TREK 2K20▼04 GHOST VENUE メモリアルパッケージカード)	Released: 1 December 2020; Label: Chaos Union, TESLAKITE; Formats: M∞Card
Zcon Memorial Package Card (ZCONメモリアル・パッケージカード)	Released: 22 July 2022; Label: Chaos Union, TESLAKITE; Formats: M∞Card

- 1 The English version of his website only allows the purchase of one song from this album, "Aurora 3".

== Live albums ==
Title	Album details	Oricon peak chart position
Error CD	Released: 11 July 1990; Label: Polydor K.K.; Formats: CD	—
Phonon 2550 Live	Released: 23 April 2008; Label: Chaos Union, TESLAKITE; Formats: CD	220
The Method of the Live 2: The Magic for Introduction (LIVEの方法２『導入のマジック』, LIVE no Hōhō "Dōnyū no Majikku")^{[1]}	Released: 29 May 2014; Label: Chaos Union, TESLAKITE; Formats: CD	52
Unreal Soprano Interactive Live Show Siren (架空のソプラノ Interactive Live Show SIREN, Kakū no Soprano")	Released: 27 November 2021; Label: Nippon Columbia, TESLAKITE; Formats: Digital download	41

- 1 Artist given as "Susumu Hirasawa and Kaku P-Model" (平沢進・核P-MODEL).

== Other releases ==
Title	Release details
Techno Zikken Koubou (テクノ実験工房; Techno Experimental Factory) series^{[1]}	Released: 8 July 1994 – 31 March 1995; Label: Hirasawa Bypass; Formats: CS
(世界細胞合唱鉄橋団; World Cell Choral Bridge Team)	Released: 28 November 1998; Label: Green Nerve; Formats: CS
Yojō Denryoku (余剰電力; Surplus Power)	Released: 22 August 2001; Label: Chaos Union, TESLAKITE; Formats: Digital download
Hantā o Tataeru Onsei Fairu (ハンターを称える音声ファイル; Audio File to Honor the Hunter)	Released: 28 November 2001; Label: Chaos Union, TESLAKITE; Formats: Digital download
Touki Youkou no Henkan Rei (冬季陽光の変換来; Winter Sunlight Conversion Example)	Released: 25 January 2002; Label: Chaos Union, TESLAKITE; Formats: Digital download
Songs Against the Carnage (殺戮への抗議配信, Satsuriku e no Kōgi Haishin)	Released: 12 March 2003; Label: Chaos Union, TESLAKITE; Formats: Digital download
P-0	Released: 2007 – 18 August 2007; Label: Chaos Union, TESLAKITE; Formats: Digital download

- 1 This is a series of recordings of a weekly FM Gunma half-hour radio show that Hirasawa hosted. It lasted 39 broadcasts, divided in 12 volumes, released in sets of 4 tapes.

== Singles ==
Main release	Release	Release details
The Ghost in Science	"World Turbine" (世界タービン, Sekai Tābin)	Released: 25 May 1990; Label: Polydor K.K.; Format: Mini CD single
Detonator Orgun 1	"Bandiria Travellers" (バンディリア旅行団, Bandiria Ryōkōdan) [Physical Navigation Version]	Released: 25 June 1991; Label: Polydor K.K.; Format: Mini CD single
Root of Spirit Essence of Hirasawa Solo Works	"Root of Spirit" (魂のふる里, Tamashii no Furusato)	Released: 10 April 1992; Label: Polydor K.K.; Format: Mini CD single
Siren	"Sairen *Siren*" (サイレン *Siren*)	Released: 1 August 1996; Label: Nippon Columbia, TESLAKITE; Format: Mini CD single
Sword-Wind Chronicle Berserk Original Soundtrack	"Berserk -Forces-"	Released: 1 November 1997; Label: Nippon Columbia, TESLAKITE; Format: Mini CD single
Berserk Millennium Falcon Arc Chapter of the Holy Demon War Original Soundtrack	"Sign"	Released: 20 December 2004; Label: Chaos Union, TESLAKITE; Format: MP3
Berserk Golden Age Arc Trilogy	"Aria"	Released: 4 February 2012; Label: Chaos Union, TESLAKITE; Format: CD single
-	"Christmas in Africa" (アフリカのクリスマス, Afurika no Kurisumasu)^{[1]}	Released: 25 December 2014; Label: Chaos Union, TESLAKITE; Formats: MP3
Technique of Relief	"Town-0 Phase-5"/"Gardener King" (庭師KING, Niwashi King)	Released: 3 November 2019; Label: Nippon Columbia, TESLAKITE; Format: 7 inch vinyl
-	"The Expedition" (遠征, Ensei)	Released: 6 May 2023; Label: Chaos Union, TESLAKITE; Formats: Digital download

- 1 Solo rerecording of 1990 collaboration (see "various artists compilations"). Fanclub members can download it and a karaoke mix for free.

=== Free MP3 samples ===
Hirasawa has semi-regularly uploaded snippets of album tracks ever since the start of professional activities online, and after going independent, regularly releases one track from an album free of charge, effectively serving the same purpose of a single in promoting the parent album.

Main release	Release	Release details
Blue Limbo	"Ride the Blue Limbo"	Released: 25 December 2002
Switched-On Lotus	"Haldyn Hotel" (ハルディン・ホテル, Harudin Hoteru)	Released: 21 January 2004
Paranoia Agent Original Soundtrack	"Reverie Hill" (夢想ヶ谷, Musō ga Tani)	Released: 16 May 2004
Ice-9	"Eurasia 21 Degrees Centigrade" (ユーラシア21°C, Yūrashia 21°C)	Released: 21 September 2005
Byakkoya – White Tiger Field	"The Westward of Time" (時間の西方, Jikan no Seihō)	Released: 22 February 2006
"Paprika" Original Soundtrack	"The Girl in Byakkoya - White Tiger Field" (白虎野の娘, Byakkoya no Musume)	Released: 23 November 2006
Planet Roll Call	"Royal Road, Paradise" (王道楽土, Ōdō Rakudo)	Released: 18 February 2009
Totsu-Gen-Hen-I	"Solid Air"	Released: 16 June 2010
Hen-Gen-Ji-Zai	"Bandiria Travellers" (バンディリア旅行団, Bandiria Ryōkōdan)	Released: 6 November 2010
The Secret of the Flowers of Phenomenon	"The Secret of the Flowers of Phenomenon" (現象の花の秘密, Genshō no Hana no Himitsu)	Released: 2 November 2012
The Man Climbing the Hologram	"The Man Climbing the Hologram" (ホログラムを登る男, Horoguramu o Noboru Otoko)	Released: 9 October 2015
The 6th Formant	"Coyote" (コヨーテ, Koyōte)	Released: 18 December 2017

=== Albumless free MP3s ===
Release	Release details
"Nuclear Power" (原子力, Genshiryoku)	Released: 24 June 2011^{[1]}
"Hyaku Tarazu-sama" (百足らず様)	Released: 12 December 2015
"Okagesama Count 1000"	Released: 2 April 2016
"The 9th Mandala" (第9曼荼羅)	Released: 7 October 2017

- 1 Performed as "Stealthman". Limited-time release, removed from No Room on 29 June 2011. Came with lyrics on text file. An instrumental mix, "Something I Took Away from Stealthman" (ステルスマンから奪った物, Suterusuman kara Ubatta Mono), also received a limited-time release (uploaded 29 June 2011, removed 4 July 2011). Both allowed re-distribution.

== Various artists compilations ==
Title	Release details	Track
Synthetic Space (恐るべき頭脳集団)	Released: 1978; Label: RVC; Formats: 12 inch vinyl	"Temptation from Necessity Bees" (いりよう蜂の誘惑, Iri-yō Hachi no Yūwaku)^{[1]}
Les Enfants II (アンファン II, Anfan II)	Released: 25 February 1989; Label: Polydor K.K.; Formats: CD	"Turista"
White Album '90	Released: 10 November 1990; Label: Polydor K.K.; Formats: CD	"Christmas in Africa" (アフリカのクリスマス, Afurika no Kurisumasu)^{[2]}
Fuhōtōki (不法投棄; Illegal Dumping)^{[3]}	Released: 26 December 1999; Label: Chaos Union, TESLAKITE; Formats: MP3	"Densha"

- 1 Also included in Mandrake's Unreleased Materials Vol. 2.
- 2 Lyrics co-written with Masami Orimo. Performed by "Susumu Hirasawa with Wakako Shimazaki"; vocals by Shimazaki. Also included in the compilations "20th anniversary BOX", "for winter music Lovers ～ TECHNO POP Xmas" and "Archetype | 1989～1995 Polydor years of Hirasawa". Rerecorded solo for Christmas 2014 (see "singles").
- 3 Group of songs released as prizes for winning a browser game.

== Compilations ==
Title	Release details	Oricon peak chart position
Root of Spirit -Essence of Hirasawa Solo Works- (魂のふる里～ESSENCE OF HIRASAWA SOLO WORKS～, Tamashii no Furusato)	Released: 2 May 1992; Label: Polydor K.K.; Formats: CD	—
Music for Movies - Great Movie Sounds of Susumu Hirasawa (映像のための音楽～平沢進サウンドトラックの世界, Eizo no Tame no Ongaku～Susumu Hirasawa Saundotorakku no Sekai; World of Susumu Hirasawa Soundtracks)	Released: 7 June 2007; Label: Chaos Union, TESLAKITE; Formats: CD	240
Haldyn Dome	Released: 29 February 2012; Label: Chaos Union, TESLAKITE; Formats: CD	—
Archetype 1989~1995 Polydor Years of Hirasawa	Released: 24 September 2014; Label: Universal Music Japan; Formats: SHM-CD	142
Symphonic Code Susumu Hirasawa Instrumental Music: The Polydor Years	Released: 5 November 2014; Label: Universal Music Japan; Formats: SHM-CD	—

== Videos ==
Title	Release details
Error (エラー, erā)	Released: 21 September 1990; Label: Polydor K.K.; Formats: VHS
Making of Tokyo Paranesian^{[1]}	Released: October 1994; Label: Hirasawa Bypass; Formats: VHS
Hirasawa Error Engine Hirasawa Three Acts in Three Hours Upper (HIRASAWA error ENGINE 平沢三幕三時間 上, Hirasawa Sanmakusan Jikan Kami)	Released: November 1994; Label: Hirasawa Bypass; Formats: VHS
Hirasawa Error Engine Hirasawa Three Acts in Three Hours Lower (HIRASAWA error ENGINE 平沢三幕三時間 下, Hirasawa Sanmakusan Jikan Shimo)	Released: November 1994; Label: Hirasawa Bypass; Formats: VHS
Sim City Tour 1995.9.6 Tokyo Shibuya Kokaido	Released: December 1995; Label: Hirasawa Bypass; Formats: VHS
Unreal Soprano Interactive Live Show Siren (架空のソプラノ INTERACTIVE LIVE SHOW SIREN, Kakū no Soprano)	Released: 21 January 1997; Label: Nippon Columbia, TESLAKITE; Formats: VHS
Interactive Live Show 2000 Philosopher's Propeller Version 1.4 (INTERACTIVE LIVE SHOW 2000 賢者のプロペラ version 1.4, Kenja no Puropera)	Released: 15 May 2001; Label: Chaos Union, TESLAKITE; Formats: VHS, DVD
Hirasawa Energy Works Solar Live LIVE SOLAR RAY	Released: 24 September 2002; Label: Chaos Union, TESLAKITE; Formats: VHS, DVD
Interactive Live Show 2003 LIMBO-54	Released: 26 November 2003; Label: Chaos Union, TESLAKITE; Formats: DVD
Reflection on the Ice-9 Gathering Ice-9 Live & Talk Event (反射の集いは氷の9 ICE-9 LIVE & TALK EVENT, Hansha no Tsudoi wa Kōri no 9)^{[2]}	Released: 19 September 2006; Label: Chaos Union, TESLAKITE; Formats: DVD
Interactive Live Show 2006 Live Byakkoya (INTERACTIVE LIVE SHOW 2006 LIVE 白虎野)	Released: 31 October 2007; Label: Chaos Union, TESLAKITE; Formats: DVD
Phonon 2550 Vision	Released: 30 October 2008; Label: Chaos Union, TESLAKITE; Formats: DVD
Phonon 2551 Vision	Released: 15 August 2009; Label: Chaos Union, TESLAKITE; Formats: DVD
Interactive Live Show 2009 Live Planet Roll Call (INTERACTIVE LIVE SHOW 2009 LIVE 点呼する惑星, Tenko Suru Wakusei)	Released: 15 February 2010; Label: Chaos Union, TESLAKITE; Formats: DVD
Phonon 2553 Vision	Released: 30 May 2011; Label: Chaos Union, TESLAKITE; Formats: DVD
Tokyo I-jigen Kudou (東京異次弦空洞)	Released: 30 November 2011; Label: Chaos Union, TESLAKITE; Formats: DVD
Phonon 2555 Vision	Released: 19 August 2013; Label: Chaos Union, TESLAKITE; Formats: DVD
Interactive Live Show 2013 Nomonos and Imium (INTERACTIVE LIVE SHOW 2013 LIVE ノモノスとイミューム, Nomonosu to Imyūmu)	Released: 28 January 2015; Label: Chaos Union, TESLAKITE; Formats: DVD
Hybrid Phonon^{[3]}	Released: 13 April 2017; Label: Chaos Union, TESLAKITE; Formats: DVD
Interactive Live Show World Cell 2015	Released: 11 July 2019; Label: Chaos Union, TESLAKITE; Formats: DVD
The 9th Mandala (第９曼荼羅, Dai Kyū Mandara)	Released: 28 March 2021; Label: Chaos Union, TESLAKITE; Formats: DVD

- 1 Mixture of concert footage and explanations of the technical aspect behind an Interactive Live Show.
- 2 Mixture of concert footage and Q&A sessions.
- 3 Artist given as "Susumu Hirasawa and Kaku P-Model" (平沢進 × 核P-MODEL).

=== Non-concert videos ===
Title	Release details
Hirasawa Susumu no CG Nengajō (平沢進のＣＧ年賀状; Susumu Hirasawa's CG New Year Message)	Released: January 1989; Label: Moire Club; Formats: VHS
Photon series	Released: 1989 – 1995; Label: Photon; Formats: VHS
Video Flyer! (Videoチラシ！, Chirashi)	Released: April 1990; Label: Polydor K.K.; Formats: VHS
P-0 (P-Soon) (ピー・スーン, Pī Sūn)	Released: 18 August 2008; Label: Chaos Union, TESLAKITE; Formats: DVD

== As Kaku P-Model ==
"Hybrid" releases, containing both solo and P-Model material, are listed elsewhere (see "live albums" and "videos").

Albums

Title	Release details	Oricon peak chart position
Vistoron	Released: 7 October 2004; Label: Chaos Union, TESLAKITE; Formats: CD	—
Gipnoza (гипноза)	Released: 6 November 2013; Label: Chaos Union, TESLAKITE; Formats: CD	31
Kai=Kai (回＝回, Kai ikōru Kai)	Released: 5 September 2018; Label: Chaos Union, TESLAKITE; Formats: CD	26
unZIP	Released: 29 October 2025; Label: Chaos Union, TESLAKITE; Formats: CD, Digital download	

Free MP3 samples

Main release	Release	Release details
Vistoron	"Big Brother"	Released: 1 October 2004
Gipnoza	"Gipnoza" (гипноза)	Released: 9 October 2013
The Method of the Live 2: The Magic for Introduction	"Adore me, I am TV" (崇めよ我はＴＶなり, Agameyo Ware wa TV Nari)	Released: 28 April 2014
Kai=Kai	"Shagan Daishi" (遮眼大師)	Released: 3 August 2018

Live memorial packages

Title	Release details
1st Live Memorials (1st ライブ達成記念)	Released: 22 February 2005; Label: Chaos Union, TESLAKITE; Formats: MP3
Kai=Kai Memorial Package Card 2018 Osaka (回=回 大阪公演 メモリアル・パッケージカード)	Released: 7 November 2018; Label: Chaos Union, TESLAKITE; Formats: M∞Card
Kai=Kai Memorial Package Card 2018 Tokyo (回=回 東京公演 メモリアル・パッケージカード)	Released: 7 January 2019; Label: Chaos Union, TESLAKITE; Formats: M∞Card
Kai=Kai Memorial Package Card 2019 Tokyo (回=回 追加公演 メモリアル・パッケージカード)	Released: 29 March 2019; Label: Chaos Union, TESLAKITE; Formats: M∞Card

Videos

Title	Release details
Live Vistoron	Released: 1 April 2005; Label: Chaos Union, TESLAKITE; Formats: DVD
Parallel Kozak (パラレル・コザック)	Released: 6 June 2015; Label: Chaos Union, TESLAKITE; Formats: DVD

Remixes

Title	Release details
"Anti-Vistoron" (Mecano Version)	Released: 1 April 2005; Label: MECANO; Formats: CD single
"Big Brother" – Reversible Separation Aspect (可逆的分離態様)	Released: 3 April 2008; Label: MECANO; Formats: CD single
Shop Mecano 10 Year Anniversary (shop MECANO 築10年): "White and Huge" (白く巨大で) t0t1	Released: 30 June 2015; Label: MECANO; Formats: CD (various artists compilation)
"Travelator"_PATYF	Released: 22 September 2018; Label: Self-released; Formats: free MP3
"Gift 2020 (Dual Perspective 2020)" (二重展望)	Released: 2 April 2020; Label: Self-released; Formats: free MP3

== Other projects ==
Project name	Other members	Release	Release details
Pre P-Model	Yasumi Tanaka; Akiro "Kamio" Arishima	Air on the Wiring (配線上のアリア, Haisenjō no Aria)	Released: 22 October 1994; Label: DIW, SYUN; Formats: CD
E-PROJECT (E-プロジェクト, E-Purojekuto)	Akiro "Kamio" Arishima; Takashi Kokubo	Synthesizer Trek (シンセサイザー・トレック, Shinsesaizā Torekku)	Released: 1980; Label: KING; Formats: 33 RPM Record
E-PROJECT (E-プロジェクト, E-Purojekuto)	E-PROJECT; BOW WOW	Suite (組曲, Kumikyoku); X-Bomber (エックス ボンバー, Ekkusu Bonbā)	Released: 21 November 1980; Label: SOUNDS MARKETING SYSTEM (SMS); Formats: 33 RPM Record
Fukō Project (不幸のプロジェクト, Fukō no Purojekuto)	Kenji Konishi	How about FUKO? (不幸はいかが?, Fukō wa ika ga?)	Released: 5 December 1996; Label: DIW, SYUN; Formats: CD
Global Trotters^{[1]}	Kenji Konishi; Hans-Joachim Roedelius; Alquimia; David Bickley; Felix Jay	Drive	Released: 25 March 1999Japan; Label: MAGNET, biosphere records; Formats: CD
Global Trotters^{[1]}	Global Trotters^{[2]} Hans-Joachim Roedelius; David Bickley; Alex Paterson^{[3]}	GLOBAL TROTTERS PROJECT volume I DRIVE	Released: 7 June 1999 United Kingdom; Label: Rykodisc; Formats: CD
Susumu Hirasawa + InhVmaN	Riccardo "InhVmaN" Brett	Tetragrammaton	Released: 25 June 2008 Japan; Label: Chaos Union, TESLAKITE Japan Bunker Productions Italy; Formats: CD single

- 1 Although Hirasawa is considered a core member of the group, he only worked on the track "Parallel Motives".
- 2 This album is a remix album of "Drive" made by Roedelius and Bickley, including a remix of "Parallel Motives".
- 3 Paterson did "Parallel Motives II", a re-remix-crossfade of the "Parallel Motives" remix.

== Collaborations ==
Artist/Group	Release	Release details	Collaboration(s)	Track(s)
The Bach Revolution	Synthesizer Study	Released: 1978; Label: OVER SEAS; Formats: 33 RPM Record	Guitar; Keyboard; Synthesizer; Arrangement^{[1]}	All
The Bach Revolution	ROCK & KEYBOARD'79; SYNTHESIZER; Supplement Record	Released: 10 October 1978; Label: April Music; Formats: 45 RPM Record	Composition; Performance	Damī no Sakuryaku (ダミーの策略)^{[2]}
The Bach Revolution	PRO-WRESTLING SUPER FIGHTER'S THEMES	Released: 1979; Label: KING; Formats: 33 1/3 RPM Record	Performance	One of These Days (吹けよ風、呼べよ嵐, Fuke yo Kaze, Yobe yo Arashi); Chinese Kung-Fu (チャイニーズ・カン・フー, Chainīzu Kan-Fū)^{[3]}
The Bach Revolution	No Warning	Released: 21 November 1979; Label: RVC; Formats: 33 RPM Record	Synthesizer^{[4]}	Polyphonic Cosmos (ポリフォニック・コスモ, Porifonikku Kosumo)
Shampoo	Tonight^{[5]}	Released: 25 April 1982; Label: Tokuma Musical Industries, CLIMAX RECORDS; Formats: 45 RPM Record	Production	All
3F=C	To-Ma-Do-I (と・ま・ど・い)	Released: Spring 1984; Label: RBF Records; Formats: 45 RPM Record	Engineering; Sound Adviser	All
Michiro Endo	VIETNAM LEGEND (ベトナム伝説, Betonamu Densetsu)	Released: 10 April 1984; Label: JICC Publishing Bureau; Formats: Cassette Book	Guitar; Keyboard	Kanon (カノン)
Michiro Endo	KI-GA KI-GA KI-KYO	Released: June 1984; Label: Self-released; Formats: 45 RPM Record	Bass; Keyboard; Arrangement	KI-GA KI-GA KI-KYO (飢餓々々帰郷)^{[6]}
Hisakatsu Igarashi	PUZZLE	Released: 1 December 1984; Label: KING RECORD, NEXUS Records; Formats: 33 RPM Record	Composition; Guitar	SEVEN JOINT MAN (七節男, Nana Fushi Otoko)^{[7]}
THE LOODS	HARD MOUSE	Released: 1985; Label: RBF Records; Formats: 33 RPM Record	Production/Adjustment; Keyboard	"Hard Mouse" and "Paradise"
THE LOODS	STOP FUCKIN' AROUND!	Released: 10 February 1985; Label: RBF Records; Formats: 33 RPM Record	Production/Adjustment; Keyboard	All^{[8]}
Michiro Endo	THE END	Released: 30 March 1985; Label: TŌSHIBA-EMI; Formats: 45 RPM Record	Synthesizer	ING, O! 7 (インゴ セブン, Ingo Sebun); WATER SISTER
THE LOODS	LOUD MACHINE	Released: 1986; Label: RBF Records; Formats: 33 RPM Record	Production	All
THE GROOVERS	Maximum Kiss	Released: 25 July 1989; Label: Alfa Records; Formats: CD	Production; Arrangement	All; For the Sister Moon (シスター・ムーンのために, Shisutā Mūn no Tameni)
Jun Togawa	10 Years in Entertainment Memorial (芸能生活十周年記念, Geinō Seikatsu Jū Shūnen Kinen); Shōwa at Death (昭和享年, Shōwa Kyōnen)	Released: 16 December 1989; Label: Teichiku Records; Formats: CD	Production; Arrangement; Performance	"Virgin Blues" (バージンブルース, Bājin Burūzu), "Princess Knight" (リボンの騎士, Ribon no Kishi), "In the Morning" (夜が明けて, Yo ga Akete) and "A Good Man Strolls By" (吹けば飛ぶよな男だが, Fukeba Tobu Yona Otoko Daga)^{[9]}
Kazutoki Umezu	KINEMA	Released: 21 April 1990; Label: NEC Avenue; Formats: CD	Vocals	FROM CHERBOURG ～ LES PARAPLUIES DE CHERBOURG (シェルブールから～シェルブールの雨傘, Sherubūru Kara ～ Sherubūru no Amagasa)
Tadahiko Yokogawa	TWO OF US	Released: December 1990; Label: VIVID SOUND, Cycle Records; Formats: CD	Lyrics; Vocals	Truk Lagoon (トラック・ラグーン, Torakku Ragūn)
Jun Togawa	Virgin Blues (バージンブルース, Bājin Burūzu)	Released: 21 December 1990; Label: Teichiku Records; Formats: Mini CD single	Arrangement; Performance	All^{[10]}
Yapoos	Dial Y for Murder (ダイヤルYを廻せ!, Daiyaru Y o Mawase!)	Released: 7 June 1991; Label: TŌSHIBA-EMI; Formats: CD	Guitar	Count from 3 (3つ数えろ, 3 Tsu Kazoero); Hysteria (ヒステリヤ, Hisuteriya)
HERE IS EDEN	I'll Continue to Play Even After the Night Falls (夜になっても遊び続けろ, Yoru ni natte mo Asobi Tsudukero)	Released: 25 June 1991; Label: Tokuma Japan Corporation, Japan Record; Formats: CD	Production; Guitar	Boku wa Mainichi Yūgata ni Naruto Sukoshi Tasogaretye Shimau (僕は毎日夕方になると少したそがれてしまう) and Memento Mori (メメントモリ)^{[11]}
Yapoos	Yapoos de la Cruz no Hanzai Teki Jinsei (ヤプーズ・デ・ラ・クルスの犯罪的人生); 96m Maki 2 Mai Kasane Mishin me Ari (96m巻・2枚重ねミシン目あり)	Released: 16 October 1991; Label: TŌSHIBA-EMI; Formats: VHS	Guitar	Mysterious Guy (ミステリアス・ガイ, Misuteriasu Gai); 3 Tsu Kazoero (3つ数えろ); Hysteria (ヒステリヤ, Hisuteriya); Red Chariot (赤い戦車, Akai Sensha); Fool Girl; Anti-ennui (アンチ・アンニュイ, Anchi-annyui); Men's JUNAN; Watakushi no Naka no Tanin (私の中の他人); Insect Forces (昆虫軍, Konchū Gun)
Yapoos	Dadada ism	Released: 28 October 1992; Label: TŌSHIBA-EMI; Formats: CD	Composition; Arrangement; Production	Virus (ヴィールス, Vīrusu)^{[12]} and Condor Gaton Dekuru (コンドルが飛んでくる)
4-D	Subconscious Unity	Released: 1993; Label: Iron Beat Manifesto; Formats: CD	Guitar	Frontier
TAKA	Hyper Angel ～Genki no Moto wa Kimi no Egao～ (Hyper Angel ～元気の素はKimiの笑顔～)	Released: 25 March 1994; Label: Polydor K.K.; Formats: Mini CD single	Production; Guitar	All
TAKA	Shelly	Released: 25 June 1994; Label: Polydor K.K.; Formats: Mini CD single	Production; Guitar	All
TAKA	TAKA	Released: 25 July 1994; Label: Polydor K.K.; Formats: CD	Production; Guitar	All
Kotobuki Hikaru with Phnonpenh Model	Desk Top Hard Lock	Released: 25 July 1994; Label: DIW, SYUN; Formats: CD	Composition	NEOTENY BOX (幼形成熟BOX, Yō Keisei Juku BOX)
Yapoos	Suspicious Activities of the Yapoos (ヤプーズの不審な行動, Yapoos no Fushin na Kōdō)	Released: 31 January 1995; Label: disk UNION, AXËL; Formats: CD	Composition	Virus (ヴィールス, Vīrusu)
Tadahiko Yokogawa	DIVE	Released: 30 September 1995; Label: DIW, SYUN; Formats: CD	Lyrics; Vocals	CALL
Yoko Ueno	e-mix Ai wa Shizukana Basho e Orite Kuru (愛は静かな場所へ降りてくる)	Released: 25 May 1996; Label: MAGNET, biosphere Records; Formats: CD	Remixing^{[13]}	Flower of Asia (アジアの花, Ajia no Hana) Tangmo Mix
PEVO	CONVEX AND CONCAVE	Released: 5 October 1996; Label: DIW, SYUN; Formats: CD	Production; Vocals; Lyrics	All; Coelacance (シーラカンス, Shīrakansu)^{[14]}
Wataru Kamiryo	Karasu (鴉 (からす))	Released: 19 October 1996; Label: Nippon Columbia, TESLAKITE; Formats: CD	Guitar Solo	voix Karasu (Crow) (鴉 (からす))
Yūko Miyamura	Mother	Released: 21 February 1998; Label: Victor Entertainment; Formats: Mini CD single	Composition; Performance; Arrangement	All
Yūko Miyamura	Spirit (魂, Tamashii)	Released: 21 March 1998; Label: Victor Entertainment; Formats: CD	Composition; Performance; Arrangement	Mother; MOON^{[15]}
Yoko Ueno	biosphere Label Sampler Plus	Released: 23 September 1998; Label: MAGNET, biosphere Records; Formats: CD	Remixing	AOIFE (remix)
Yūko Miyamura	大四喜 (Daisūshii)	Released: 25 August 1999; Label: Victor Entertainment; Formats: CD	Composition; Performance; Arrangement	Ruktun or Die^{[16]}
Yuiko	Man of the Land (陸の人よ, Riku no Hito yo)	Released: 26 March 2003; Label: Warner Music Japan; Formats: CD single	Composition^{[17]} Performance	Man of the Land (陸の人よ, Riku no Hito yo)^{[18]}
NHK Okāsan to Issho	Saishin Best (最新ベスト) – Kono Yubi Tomare (このゆびとまれ)	Released: 16 October 2003; Label: Pony Canyon; Formats: CD	Composition; Arrangement	Earth Cat (地球ネコ, Chikyū Neko)
NHK Okāsan to Issho	Tanpopodan ni Hairou！！ (タンポポ団にはいろう！！)	Released: 21 April 2004; Label: Pony Canyon; Formats: DVD	Composition; Arrangement	Earth Cat (地球ネコ, Chikyū Neko)
4-D	Die offizielle Raubkopie	Released: 1 August 2006; Label: Self-released; Formats: CD	Guest (Computer; Programming; Vocals; Guitar)	Session7_1 (Yoko-Nari~Koni-Hira~Hirasawa Session)
4-D	Rekonnekted	Released: 21 February 2008; Label: 4-D Label; Formats: CD	Guitar	My Neighbor Upstairs
4-D	Hiiro no Crew (緋色のCrew)	Released: 28 December 2009; Label: 4-D Label; Formats: CD-R	Guitar	Hiiro no Crew (緋色のCrew) (nylon destroyed mix)
4-D	DENKMAL	Released: 20 September 2010; Label: 4-D Label; Formats: CD	Guitar	Hiiro no Crew (緋色のCrew) (Teruo Nakano's Cafè Mix)
4-D	DRIVE	Released: 18 October 2013; Label: 4-D Label; Formats: CD-R	Guitar	CREST
4-D	Wieder	Released: 28 December 2013; Label: 4-D Label; Formats: CD-R	Guitar; Vocals	Wieder
PEVO	The Spot Directive (スポット破壊指令, Supotto Hakai Shirei)	Released: 9 November 2014; Label: Pullmozile; Formats: CD	Guitar^{[19]}	Ya! Po! Kids of the Stars (星の子ども, Hoshi no Kodomo)
PEVO	OFFICIAL BOOTLEG DVD; NEOZIC	Released: 4 April 2015; Label: Pullmozile; Formats: DVD	Guitar; Vocals^{[19]}	Nec-Ro-Man-Ser (ネクロマンサー, Nekuromansā); Kids of the Stars (星の子ども, Hoshi no Kodomo); Konperitan Chippuru (コンペリタンチップル); Ya! Po! A Spotless World (スポットのない世界, Supotto no Nai Sekai)
Kera & the Synthesizers	Keralino Sandorovich Music Hour (ケラリーノ・サンドロヴィッチ・ミューヂック・アワー, Kerarīno Sandorovicchi Myūjikku Awā)	Released: 21 September 2016; Label: Solid Records, Nagom Records; Formats: CD	Vocals; Guitar	Ohayo (オハヨウ); Rush Job (やっつけ仕事, Yattsuke Shigoto)
minus(-)	V	Released: 28 December 2016; Label: Avex Trax; Formats: DVD, BD	Vocals; Guitar	Descent into Madness; Close; Peepshow; Dawn words falling B612; Texture
Hikashu	Zekkei (絶景; Magnificent View)	Released: 15 December 2017; Label: Makigami Office; Formats: digital download, CD, DVD	Vocals; Guitar	Gardener King (庭師KING, Niwashi KING); Melancholy in the Global City (グローバルシティの憂鬱, Gurōbaru Shiti no Yūutsu); Missile (ミサイル, Misairu); Pike (パイク, Paiku); Ruktun or Die; I Got It (ナルホド, Naruhodo); Art Mania (美術館で会った人だろ, Bijutsukan de Atta Hito Daro; You're the Person I Met in the Art Museum); Puyo Puyo (プヨプヨ)
Toshifumi Nakai	Monogrammed	Released: 14 June 2018; Label: Teslakite; Formats: digital download, CD	Guitar Solo; Oneshot Voice	Transpose In and Inside; Ranjiku
Hajime Fukuma	This is Our Music	Released: 1 April 2020; Label: Heliosphere; Formats: CD, digital download	performance	
NeoBallad	05 -zerogo-	Released: 29 March 2021; Label: Zapp; Formats: CD, digital download	guitar	"Nanbu Ushioi Uta" (南部牛追い唄) II (Iwate Prefecture Min'yō)

- 1 Performed with Mandrake.
- 2 This record was included with a magazine that had an opinion piece by Hirasawa on Tony Banks published in it.
- 3 Performed with Mandrake. Covers of the entrance themes of Abdullah the Butcher and Jumbo Tsuruta.
- 4 Credited under "Special Thanks", alongside P-Model keyboardist Yasumi Tanaka, who appears in the track Obelisk (オベリスク, Oberisuku).
- 5 "Tonight" was also included in the compilation "TECHNOLOID 〜JAPANESE 80's NEW WAVE SAMPLER〜" (which also includes the P-Model song "Art Mania"). "Stock" (ストック, Sutokku) was also included in the compilation "Impossibles! ~ 80's JAPANESE PUNK & NEW WAVE" (which also includes the "Countless Answers" version of the P-Model song "Atom-Siberia").
- 6 Released with the magazine "ING, O! No.5". Act name given as "Michiro Endo + Susumu Hirasawa + Korechika Kitada + Jun Inui". The only track was also included in the compilation "KI-GA KI-GA KI-KYO".
- 7 Rerecording of the P-Model song of the same name from the album "Scuba". with new arrangement & guitar lines.
- 8 Fellow P-Model member Shunichi Miura also plays keyboards on all tracks.
- 9 Those tracks were also included in the compilations "TWIN ～ VERY BEST COLLECTION" and "TEICHIKU WORKS – 30th anniversary".
- 10 The tracks with vocals were included in the compilations "TWIN ～ VERY BEST COLLECTION", "TOGAWA LEGEND – SELF SELECT BEST & RARE 1979～2008" and "TEICHIKU WORKS – 30th anniversary". The title track was included in the compilation "Sanagika no Onna: Mika Ninagawa Selection" and its music video was included in the 2002 and 2012 reissues of the video "Yapoos Keikaku" and the compilation "TEICHIKU WORKS – 30th anniversary". All tracks exclusive to this release are included in reissues of Shōwa Kyōnen.
- 11 "Memento Mori" was also included in the compilation "GROOVIN' Shōwa! 7 ～ Romantist".
- 12 This song was included in the compilation "TOGAWA LEGEND – SELF SELECT BEST & RARE 1979～2008".
- 13 Remixed with fellow P-Model member Hajime Fukuma.
- 14 A cover of a P-Model song of the same name from the album Perspective (the original's lyrics were written by Hirasawa and Tanaka and the music was composed by Tanaka). The entire album's lyrics are sung in the PEVO language, which was created by the band (a dictionary can be found in the booklet) and some of them sung by a pitch-shifted Hirasawa, who wasn't credited for either lyrics or vocals, but was credited for production as "Volquice Proladuke".
- 15 "Mother" was included in the compilation "Best Collection ~ Meccha Best".
- 16 Hirasawa would later re-record this song 5 times, with himself on vocals.
- 17 Co-written with Yuiko. Co-Credited under the pseudonym "Shirō Sakata".
- 18 Also included in the album "Crystal" (結晶, Kesshō).
- 19 Credited as "Volquice Proladuke".
