= Ice-nine (disambiguation) =

Ice-nine is a fictional solid polymorph of water from Kurt Vonnegut's novel, Cat's Cradle.

Ice-nine may also refer to:

- Ice IX, a form of solid water stable at temperatures below 140 K
- Ice Nine (video game), a first-person shooter video game for the Game Boy Advance
- ICE-9, a fictional computer virus in the American science fiction crime drama television series Person of Interest

== Music ==
- "Ice 9", the second track on Joe Satriani's 1987 album, Surfing with the Alien
- ICE-9 (album), an instrumental album by Susumu Hirasawa
- Kerach 9 (English: Ice 9), an Israeli Rock band
- Lyod 9 (English: Ice 9), a 2001 album by Russian rock band Smyslovye Gallyutsinatsii
- Ice Nine Publishing, music publishers for the Grateful Dead
- 9ice, Nigerian musician, songwriter and dancer
- Ice Nine Kills, an American heavy metal band

== Television ==
- ICE-9, a fictional computer virus in the American science fiction crime drama television series Person of Interest

== Video Games ==
- Ice Nine, a first-person shooter video game for the Game Boy Advance
- Ice-9, a substance similar to the Cat's Cradle element used as a plot point in the video game 999: Nine Hours, Nine Persons, Nine Doors, described as "a special form of ice does not melt at room temperature", which is the subject of an in-game urban legend about an Egyptian priestess whose body was preserved in the substance and stored as cargo on the RMS Titanic
