= Phonon 2555 Vision =

Video by Susumu Hirasawa
- Released: August 19, 2013
- Recorded: 6 – 8 June 2012
- Venue: U-Port Hall, Nishigotanda, Shinagawa, Tokyo
- Genre: Choral; collage; electronica; new-age; progressive rock; symphonic rock; technopop; world
- Length: 1:45:07
- Label: Chaos Union, TESLAKITE CHTE-0072
- Director: Masanori Chinzei
- Producer: Susumu Hirasawa

Susumu Hirasawa video chronology
Tokyo I-jigen Kudou (2011)	Phonon 2555 Vision (2013)	Interactive Live Show 2013; Nomonos and Imium (2015)

Phonon 2555 Vision is a live video album by Susumu Hirasawa. It contains recordings of the Phonon 2555 shows from 2012, part of the "Phonon" series of Hirasawa concerts. The number on the title represents the year of the performance on the Thai solar calendar.

== Overview ==
The shows featured two guest performers: Yasuhiro Araki and PEVO 1go. Araki was the drummer of Hirasawa's New Wave band P-Model from 1984 to 1987, appearing on Karkador and One Pattern (one song from this period was performed on each show), PEVO 1go is the guitarist of the P-Model/Devo tribute band PEVO, who have collaborated with Hirasawa since the 90s. The concerts were the first to feature guest musicians (outside of singers brought as actors to Interactive Live Shows), since 2000's Philosopher's Propeller shows, and the second "Phonon" concert to do so since the Live Phonon ones from 1999. The instruments of the guests were incorporated on into the Phonon 2555 logo. Hirasawa played a Roland A-500PRO keyboard (later incorporated into his Studio WIRESELF setup) on the shows, the first time he's so live since Phonon 2551 in 2008. In the first and second shows the Fernandes PHOTON guitar was used for guitar solos, while in the third show Hirasawa used the EVO 0101Z guitar, a gift from Hisashi; it was the first show where he used it, and later turned it into his main Talbo guitar.

The Phonon 2555 setlists draw heavily from Hirasawa's soundtrack-related works, as well as rarely performed songs from all of his main solo albums (except Virtual Rabbit) and one from Araki's tenure in P-Model which was grandfathered into Hirasawa's solo repertoire, some of which hadn't appeared in live shows since 1994. All three concerts had the same songs in their setlists, the only changes being the order of performance and switching of two spots from the middle of the shows: A song from either Blue Limbo or Byakkoya - White Tiger Field, and an advance premiere of a song from The Secret of The Flowers of Phenomenon. The titles announced for the unreleased songs were considered tentative, but ended up as the definitive ones. The last show forms the bulk of the DVD, with songs performed only on the first two shows included as bonus tracks: 21 & 23 from the first show, 22 & 24 from the second.

Each show got a low quality, single camera angle live broadcast through dedicated Ustream channels. "Aria", the themes song of the Berserk: The Golden Age Arc film trilogy was released in advance as a bonus on the home video releases of the second film, Battle for Doldrey (both the first Hirasawa release on Blu-ray and the first dedicated video release for regions outside Japan), the version on Phonon 2555 Vision has different angles from those of the Battle for Doldrey version. A logo sticker comes as a bonus with the DVD, whose design is heavily geared toward a "caged Tesla coil" motif.

== Track listing ==
All tracks are written by Susumu Hirasawa.

No.	Title	Length
1.	"Haldyn Hotel" (ハルディン・ホテル Harudin Hoteru)
2.	"TOWN-0 PHASE-5"
3.	"Cyborg" (サイボーグ Saibōgu)
4.	"Opus (The Fool's Rose Garden)" (作業(愚者の薔薇園) Sagyō (Gusha no Baraen))
5.	"SAIREN *Siren*" (サイレン *Siren*)
6.	"No Workshop" (仕事場はタブー Shigotoba wa Taboo)
7.	"Dune" (デューン Dyūn)
8.	"Strange Night of the Omnificience" (万象の奇夜 Banshō no Kiya)
9.	"Water Vein" (水脈 Sui Myaku)
10.	"The Sillborn City" (生まれなかった都市 Umarenakatta Toshi)
11.	"Night Walking Wearing the Human Body" (人体夜行 Jintai Yagyō)
12.	"Circular G" (空転G Kūten G)
13.	"Rubedo (Reddening)" (ルベド(赤化) Rubedo (Sekka))
14.	"Probability Hill" (確率の丘 Kakuritsu no Oka)
15.	"Lotus"
16.	"Gardener King" (庭師KING Niwashi KING)
17.	"Take the Wheel" (舵をとれ Kaji wo Tore)
18.	"Aria"
19.	"The Great Deceiver of Saint Horseshoe Planet" (聖馬蹄形惑星の大詐欺師 Sei Batei Kei Wakusei no Dai Sagishi) (encore)
20.	"Dreaming Machine" (夢みる機械 Yume Miru Kikai) (encore)
21.	"Byakko – White Tiger" (白虎) (bonus track)
22.	"Sathwan Calendar 8869" (サトワン暦8869年 Satowan Reki 8869 Nen) (bonus track)
23.	"The Shadow of Bloom" (華の影 Hana no Kage) (bonus track)
24.	"Brain-Centric Theory" (脳動説 Nō-Dō Setsu) (bonus track)

== Personnel ==
- Susumu Hirasawa – Vocals, Electric guitars, Acoustic guitar, Keyboard, Personal computer, Laser harp, Mixing console, Production

Guest performers

- Yasuhiro Araki – Timpani, Electronic percussion, Wind chimes
- PEVO 1go – Electric guitar, Misa Kitara, Zeusaphone

Staff

- Masanori Chinzei – Direction, Recording, Mixing, Mastering
- Makoto Okada (EASTAGE) – DVD authoring
- Syotaro Takami – Translation
- Toshifumi "non graph" Nakai – Sleeve Design
- Presented by Chaos Union / TESLAKITE: Kenji sato, Rihito Yumoto, Mika Hirano, Kinuko Mochizuki and Misato Oguro
