= Kerach 9 =

Israeli rock band

Kerach tesha קרח תשע
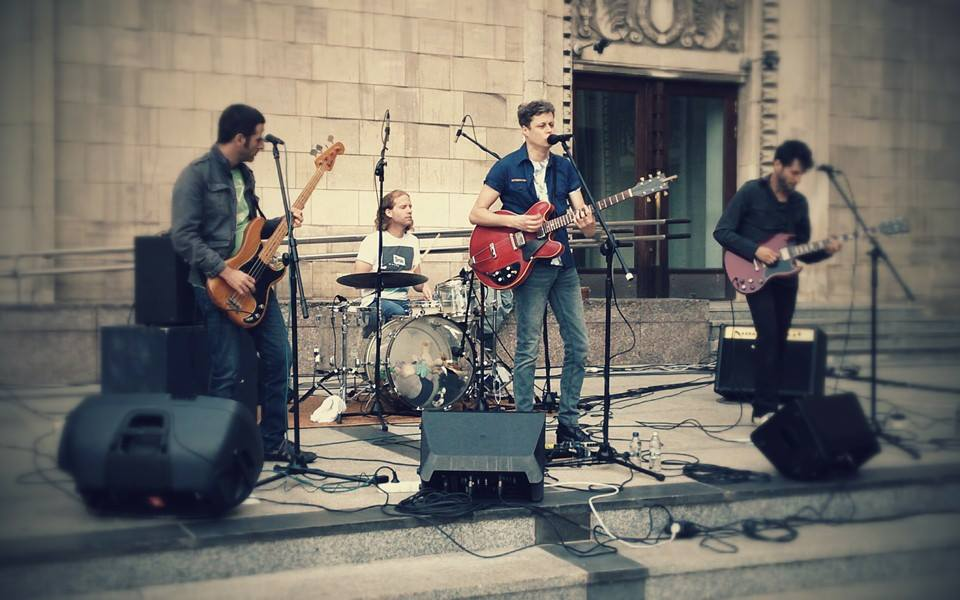
- Left to right: Roy Haddas, Uri Meiselman, Noam Rotem, Ohad Koski

Background information
- Origin: Kfar Saba, Israel
- Genre: Rock
- Years active: 1993–2000; 2013–present
- Label: NMC
- Members: Noam Rotem; Roy Hadas; Ohad Koski; Uri Meiselman

Kerach tesha (Hebrew: קרח תשע – "Ice-nine"; pronounced [ˈkeʁaχ ˈteʃa]) is an Israeli rock band active in the years 1993–2000, and reactivated in 2013.

== History ==
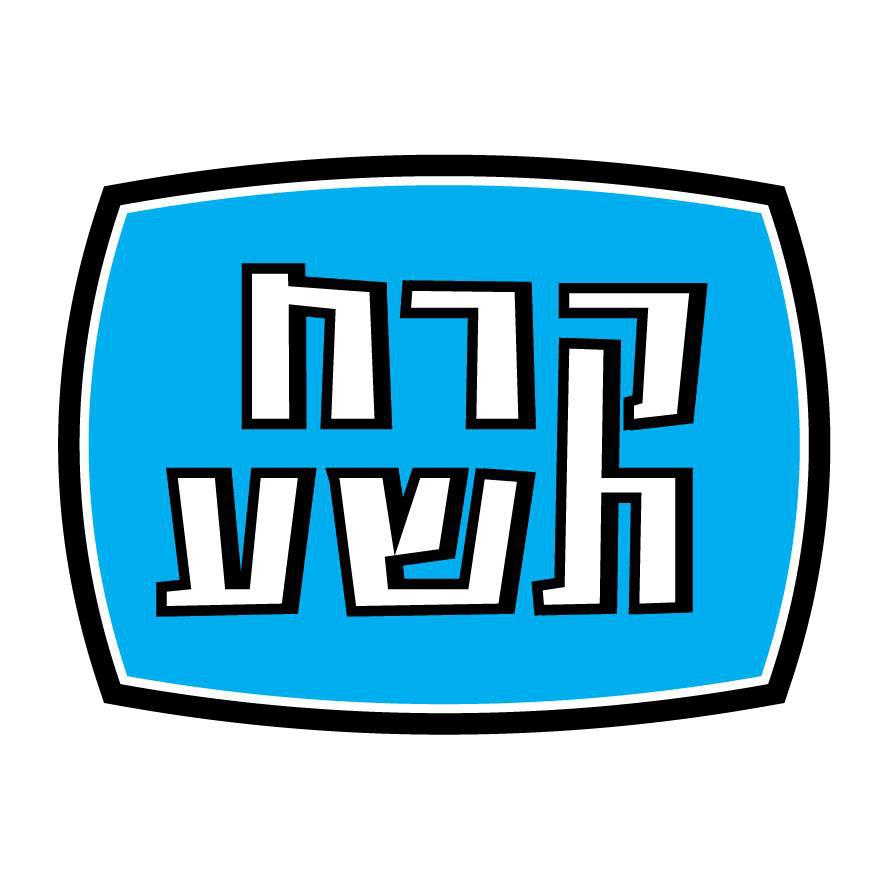
Kerach tesha (logo)

=== Beginning ===
Kerach tesha was formed in 1993 in Kfar Saba, Israel, when its members were at the age of 19. The name is taken from Kurt Vonnegut's novel Cat's Cradle, where Ice-nine is a material that acts as a seed crystal and causes the solidification of the entire body when it comes in contact with water. In 1995 the band recorded first sketches under the production of Shai Lahav (from "Mofa Ha'arnavot Shel Dr. Kasper") and played as a warm-up band at Monica Sex's concerts. Among the cover versions the band played was Yossi Banai's song "I, Simon and little Moïse".

=== Top time ===
In 1996 the band was signed to NMC Music label and in 1997 released its debut album The Beginning of The Right Life (Hebrew: תחילתם של החיים הנכונים, "Tkhilatam Shel HaKhaim HaNekonim"), musically produced by Moshe Levi and Asaf Talmudi. The album had several radio hits: "Young Mothers" (אמהות צעירות, "Imahot Tze'i'rot"), "Movies" (סרטים, "Sratim") and "With Him Forever" (איתו לנצח, "Itto LaNetzakh"), which is considered to be the first explicit gay pop song in Hebrew, and therefore sparked considerable interest in the band and in the album, which became a great success. The song "With Him Forever" reached the Israeli annual Hebrew song chart that year. The band then began playing as the warm-up band for Aviv Geffen and "The Mistakes" (Hatauyot). In June the band played as a warm-up band for "Suede" (which was one of the bands that had influenced "Kerach tesha" the most).

In 1999 the band released its second album, "Kerach tesha", also produced by Levi and Talmudi. The album produced the hits "Sun" (שמש, "Shemesh") and "My Ex-girlfriend" (החברה שלי לשעבר, "HaKhavera Sheli Leshe'avar"). The album hosted Shlomi Shaban (piano) in his first recording of non-classical music.

=== Last hit and break-up ===
In 2000 the band released its last hit, "Assaf Amdursky", which tells the story of a woman in love with the singer. Assaf Amdursky himself used to play the song in the tour that accompanied his successful album "Silent Engines" (מנועים שקטים, "Meno'im Shketim"). A few months after the single was released, the band broke up.

In 2001 the band reunited for several concerts, and even recorded a new song titled "There's Not Enough Night" (אין מספיק לילה, "En Maspik Laïla"); the song was never officially released, but a bootleg recording can be found on the Internet.

=== Aftermath ===
After the band's break-up, lead singer Noam Rotem turned to a solo career. He released three albums: "Human Warmth" (חום אנושי, "Khom Enoshi"), "Help Is On The Way" (עזרה בדרך, "Ezra BaDerekh") and "Iron and Stones" (ברזל ואבנים, "Barzel Ve'Avanim"). The other three band members later formed a band named "The Koskim" (or "The Kosks"; הקוסקים, "HaKoskim"), which released an album called "Resting In Quick Worlds" (נחים בעולמות זריזים, "Nakhim Be'Olamot Zrizim"), with Ohad Koski, "Kerach tesha"'s guitarist, as the lead singer. Noam Rotem took part in writing some of the songs in the album, and also played guitar. In 2005 "The Koskim" released the album "Abramek" (in cooperation with HaNoar HaOved VeHaLomed), which consists of poems written by young Abramek Koplowicz, a Polish Jew from the Łódź Ghetto, who was murdered in Auschwitz in the age of 14. His most known song "Dream" tells about the world's wonders that he wished to visit at age 20.

==== International tour ====
In 2014, Kerach tesha made their first international tour, which was to Poland. The tour was dedicated to the memory of Abramek Koplowicz and includes concerted in Warsaw, Łódź, Zduńska Wola, Oświęcim and Kraków. In Oświęcim they played as support for Eric Clapton at the Life Festival Oświęcim.

==== Film music ====
In 2014 the flag song of Kerach tesha: "איתו לנצח", ("Itto LaNetzakh", eng: "With Him Forever") has been included as intro song to the Israeli film series "שושנה חלוץ מרכזי" (eng: Shoshana center forward).

== Band members ==
- Noam Rotem (נעם רותם): lead singer and guitar
- Roy Hadas (רועי הדס): bass and vocals
- Ohad Koski (אוהד קוסקי): guitar and vocals
- Uri Meiselman (אורי מייזלמן): drums and cymbals

Musical production: Moshe Levi and Asaf Talmudi.

== Discography ==
- 1996 – The Beginning of The Right Life (Hebrew: תחילתם של החיים הנכונים, "Tkhilatam Shel HaKhaim HaNekonim")
- 1999 – Kerach tesha
- 2000 – "Assaf Amdursky" (single), attached to a special issue of the second album
