= Berserk soundtrack =

The Berserk series has produced several soundtracks:

- Berserk Anime Soundtrack from the Berserk anime series
- Berserk: Millennium Falcon Hen Wasurebana no Shō Original Game Soundtrack from the Sega Dreamcast game Sword of the Berserk: Guts' Rage
- Berserk Millennium Falcon Arc: Chapter of the Holy Demon War Original Game Soundtrack, from the PlayStation 2 game Berserk Millennium Falcon Arc: Chapter of the Holy Evil War

Susumu Hirasawa music
