= SimCity (disambiguation) =

SimCity is a video game series.

SimCity or Sim City may also refer to:

- SimCity (1989 video game), in the SimCity video game series
- SimCity (2013 video game), in the SimCity video game series
- Sim City (album), by Susumu Hirasawa, 1995
