= Paprika (soundtrack) =

Paprika Original Soundtrack

Soundtrack album by Susumu Hirasawa
- Released: 23 November 2006
- Studio: Studio WIRESELF 2002 Solar Version
- Genres: Choral; Collage; Electronica; Progressive rock; Symphonic; World
- Length: 43:31
- Labels: Chaos Union, TESLAKITE
- Producer: Susumu Hirasawa

Susumu Hirasawa soundtrack chronology
Paranoia Agent Original Soundtrack (2004)	Paprika Original Soundtrack (2006)	Free Music for Free-Lance Journalists and Independent Media (2011)

Paprika Original Soundtrack (「パプリカ」オリジナルサウンドトラック, "Papurika" Orijinaru Saundotorakku) is the soundtrack to the 2006 film Paprika and was released on November 23, 2006, under the TESLAKITE label. It was composed by Susumu Hirasawa. A bonus movie was included with the CD.

The soundtrack is notable for being one of the first film scores to use Vocaloid (Lola as the "voicebank") for vocals. It's also the last of Hirasawa's albums where an Amiga computer was used for composition. All MIDI was sequenced through an Amiga 4000 running the Bars n Pipes program.

== Track listing ==
All tracks are written by Susumu Hirasawa.

No.	Title	Length
1.	"Parade" (パレード Parēdo)	5:45
2.	"Mediational Field" (媒介野 Baikaiya)	4:59
3.	"A Blind Spot in a Corridor" (回廊の死角 Kairō no Shikaku)	1:59
4.	"Welcome to the Circus" (サーカスへようこそ Sākasu e Yōkoso)	1:00
5.	"A Tree in the Dark" (暗がりの木 Kuragari no Ki)	1:26
6.	"Escapee" (逃げる者 Nigeru Mono)	3:14
7.	"Lounge"	2:05
8.	"The Shadow" (その影 Sono Kage)	3:19
9.	"A Drop Filled with Memories" (滴いっぱいの記憶 Shizuku Ippai no Kioku)	4:39
10.	"Chaser" (追う者 Ou Mono)	3:03
11.	"Prediction" (予期 Yoki)	1:44
12.	"Parade" (パレード Parēdo) (instrumental)	5:51
13.	"The Girl in Byakkoya – White Tiger Field" (白虎野の娘 Byakkoya no Musume) (Paprika Ending Theme) (パプリカ・エンディングテーマ Papurika Endingu Tēma)	4:47
14.	"The Girl in Byakkoya – White Tiger Field" (白虎野の娘 Byakkoya no Musume) (short movie) (extra track)	2:35

downloadable outtake
No.	Title	Length
2.	"Runner" (走る者 Hashiru Mono)	3:03

"Parade" was originally released on the album Byakkoya – White Tiger Field. "The Girl in Byakkoya – White Tiger Field" is a slight rerecording of that album's title track.

== Personnel ==
- Susumu Hirasawa – Voice, Electronic keyboard, Amiga, Personal computer, Digital audio workstation, Synthesizers, Vocaloid, Sampler, Sequencer, Programming, Production
- Masanori Chinzei – Recording, Mixing, Mastering
- Rihito Yumoto and Mika Hirano (Chaos Union) – A&R
- Kiyoshi Inagaki – Design
- Jodi Tack – Album Art Direction (US release)
- Hideki Namai – Photography
- Satoshi Kon – Art (movie stills on US release)
- Syotaro Takami and Nicholas D. Kent – Translation
- Dave Plisky – Translation (US release)
- Masaru Owaku – VideoClip direction
- Thanks: UK Nakagaw, Usagi Tanaka

== Release history ==
Region	Date	Label(s)	Format	Catalog	Notes
Japan	November 23, 2006	Chaos Union, Teslakite	enhanced CD	CHTE-0038	Comes in cardboard slipcase.
Japan	November 23, 2006	Chaos Union, Teslakite	Digital Download	none	
France	February 26, 2007	Milan Entertainment	enhanced CD	399 107–2	
France	February 26, 2007	Milan Entertainment	Digital Download	none	
United States	May 22, 2007	Milan Entertainment	enhanced CD	M2-36284	Has all-new package design centered around the film. Cover is detail from the US release's poster.
United States	May 22, 2007	Milan Entertainment	Digital Download	none	
