= Berserk: The Golden Age Arc =

Japanese dark fantasy anime films

- Theatrical release poster of Berserk: The Golden Age Arc I – The Egg of the King

ベルセルク 黄金時代篇 (Beruseruku Ōgon Jidai-hen)
- Genre: Dark fantasy; Epic fantasy
- Created by: Kentaro Miura
- Anime film series

I: The Egg of the King; II: The Battle for Doldrey; III: The Advent
- Directed by: Toshiyuki Kubooka
- Produced by: Eiichi Kamagata; Mitsuru Ooshima; Akira Shimada; Eiko Tanaka
- Written by: Ichirō Ōkouchi
- Music by: Shirō Sagisu; Susumu Hirasawa
- Studio: Studio 4°C
- Licensed by: AUS: Madman Entertainment; NA: Viz Media; UK: Kazé UK
- Released: February 4, 2012; June 23, 2012; February 1, 2013
- Runtime: 77 minutes; 98 minutes; 113 minutes
- Anime television series

Berserk: The Golden Age Arc – Memorial Edition
- Directed by: Yuta Sano
- Written by: Ichirō Ōkouchi
- Music by: Shirō Sagisu; Susumu Hirasawa
- Studio: Studio 4°C
- Licensed by: Crunchyroll
- Original network: Tokyo MX, GYT, GTV, BS11
- Original run: October 2, 2022 – December 25, 2022
- Episodes: 13
- icon

Berserk: The Golden Age Arc (Japanese: ベルセルク 黄金時代篇, Hepburn: Beruseruku Ōgon Jidai-hen) is a Japanese anime film trilogy, which adapts Kentaro Miura's Berserk manga series's Golden Age arc. It was produced by Studio 4°C and distributed by Warner Bros. Pictures Japan. The first two films, The Egg of the King and The Battle for Doldrey, were released in Japan in February and June 2012, and the third film, The Advent, was released in February 2013. In North America, Viz Media has licensed the trilogy for English home video release. A remastered edited version for television with new scenes, labeled as "Memorial Edition", was broadcast for 13 episodes from October to December 2022.

== Plot summary ==
=== The Egg of the King ===
A soldier named Guts attracts the attention of a mercenary group, The Band of the Hawk, when he kills an enemy champion during a siege. He is forced into joining the group after being defeated in single combat by its leader, Griffith. The Band of the Hawk are employed by the Kingdom of Midland for its Hundred Year War against the Tudor Empire, and Griffith rises in the kingdom's hierarchy after a successful battle. During another siege, Guts and Griffith encounter the demon Nosferatu Zodd, who notices the pendant around Griffith's neck and warns Guts that Griffith will be his doom. Griffith's rise in status is ill-received by Midland's noblemen, and there is a failed assassination attempt on Griffith by the king's brother, Julius. Griffith charges Guts with murdering Julius, and Guts also kills the noble's young son. Guts, emotionally scarred by his actions, overhears Griffith say that The Band of the Hawk are his comrades, but for people to be friends they must pursue their own dreams and not someone else's.

=== The Battle for Doldrey ===
Guts and Casca are separated from The Band of the Hawk, and fend off attacks by the Tudor's cruel commander Adon and his men. Guts defeats most of Adon's men while covering Casca's escape, but begins to lament his life's path and decides he will eventually leave the Band of the Hawk, find and pursue his own dream, and become a true friend to Griffith. Later, the Band of the Hawk participates in the battle to capture the impenetrable Fortress of Doldrey and end the Hundred Years War, wherein Casca kills Adon. A month after the war's end, Guts parts ways with Griffith after defeating him in a duel. Griffith is distraught at Guts' departure, and in a lapse of judgment he is caught sleeping with the king's daughter, Charlotte. Griffith is charged with treason and imprisoned in the Tower of Rebirth while the members of the Band of the Hawk are branded outlaws.

=== The Advent ===
A year after Guts' departure from the Band of the Hawk, he returns to aid them in freeing Griffith from the Tower of Rebirth. However, when they find Griffith he is barely alive, rendered mute, and physically withered after months of torture. Griffith attempts suicide, and his pendant reacts to his despair, opening a portal to another dimension experiencing a solar eclipse that draws in him and The Band of the Hawk. There, they encounter archdemons known as The God Hand and Griffith is told that his tribulations have been leading to this moment, when Griffith agrees to sacrifice his allies in exchange for being reborn as Femto, a member of the God Hand. The Band of the Hawk are slaughtered by the God Hand's monstrous Apostles (former humans like Nosferatu Zodd) and Femto rapes Casca. Guts loses his left arm and right eye trying to save Casca, but Casca loses her sanity from the nightmarish ordeal. Guts and Casca are spirited back to their world by the mysterious Skull Knight, who tells Guts he has been branded by the God Hand and will be subjected to nightly attacks by evil creatures. Guts leaves Casca under the care of former comrade Rickert and embarks on a journey to hunt down Apostles and the God Hand.

== Voice cast ==
The Japanese voice cast features Hiroaki Iwanaga as Guts (replacing Nobutoshi Canna from the original anime), Takahiro Sakurai as Griffith (replacing Toshiyuki Morikawa), and Toa Yukinari as Casca (replacing Yūko Miyamura). The English voice cast features Marc Diraison as Guts, Kevin T. Collins as Griffith, and Carrie Keranen as Casca, all reprising their roles from the original anime.

Band of the Hawk	Character	Japanese voice actor	English dub actor
Band of the Hawk	Guts	Hiroaki Iwanaga	Marc Diraison
Band of the Hawk	Griffith Griffith (young)	Takahiro Sakurai	Kevin T Collins
Band of the Hawk	Griffith Griffith (young)	Ayako Takeuchi	Barbara Goodson
Band of the Hawk	Casca	Toa Yukinari	Carrie Keranen
Band of the Hawk	Judeau	Yuki Kaji	Christopher Kromer
Band of the Hawk	Rickert	Minako Kotobuki	Michelle Newman
Band of the Hawk	Corkus	Yoshiro Matsumoto	Doug Erholtz
Band of the Hawk	Pippin	Takahiro Fujiwara	Patrick Seitz
Band of the Hawk	Gaston	Kazuki Yao	Sean Schemmel
Members of the Midland Court	King of Midland	Nobuyuki Katsube	Christopher Corey Smith
Members of the Midland Court	Princess Charlotte	Aki Toyosaki	Rachael Lillis (I); G.K. Bowes (II and III)
Members of the Midland Court	Julius	Rikiya Koyama	Jesse Corti
Members of the Midland Court	Adonis	Maki Mizuma	Colin DePaula
Members of the Midland Court	Anna	Ayako Takeuchi	Lisa Ortiz
Members of the Midland Court	Hassan	Hiroshi Arikawa	Michael Sorich
Members of the Midland Court	Raban	Hochu Otsuka	Marc Thompson
God Hand	Void	Shinji Ogawa	Jon Avner
God Hand	Slan	Miyuki Sawashiro	Cindy Robinson
God Hand	Ubik	Chafurin	Liam O'Brien
God Hand	Conrad	Rikiya Koyama	Sean Schemmel
Other adversaries/ Miscellaneous	Nosferatu Zodd	Kenta Miyake	J David Brimmer
Other adversaries/ Miscellaneous	Skull Knight	Akio Otsuka	Jamieson Prince
Other adversaries/ Miscellaneous	Bazuso	Kendo Kobayashi	David B Mitchell
Other adversaries/ Miscellaneous	General Gien	Shingo Egami	Sean Schemmel
Other adversaries/ Miscellaneous	Gennon	Kazuki Yao	Steve Kramer
Other adversaries/ Miscellaneous	Adon	Rikiya Koyama	Mike Pollock
Other adversaries/ Miscellaneous	Boscogn	Takayuki Sugo	TJ Storm
Other adversaries/ Miscellaneous	Torturer	Chafurin	Liam O'Brien
Other adversaries/ Miscellaneous	Silat	Yuichi Nakamura	JB Blanc
Other adversaries/ Miscellaneous	Erica	Ayana Taketatsu	Michele O'Medlin
Other adversaries/ Miscellaneous	Old Fortuneteller	Guin-poon-chaw	Barbara Goodson

== Release ==
The project was first announced as a new anime project in September 2010. The films were distributed by Warner Bros. Pictures Japan. Berserk: The Golden Age Arc I – The Egg of the King (ベルセルク 黄金時代篇I 覇王の卵, Beruseruku Ōgon Jidai-hen Wan Haō no Tamago) was released on February 4, 2012, in Japan.

Berserk: The Golden Age Arc II – The Battle for Doldrey (ベルセルク 黄金時代篇II ドルドレイ攻略, Beruseruku Ōgon Jidai-hen Tsū Dorudorei Koryaku) was released on June 23, 2012, in Japan.

Berserk: The Golden Age Arc III – The Advent (ベルセルク 黄金時代篇III 降臨, Beruseruku Ōgon Jidai-hen Surī Kōrin) was released on February 1, 2013, in Japan.

In North America, Viz Media has licensed all three films for a home video release. The Egg of the King was released on November 27, 2012; The Battle for Doldrey was released on August 6, 2013; and The Advent was released on April 15, 2014. The Golden Age Arc has also been available for streaming on Netflix.

=== Memorial Edition ===
In June 2022, it was announced that the trilogy would receive a television broadcast version, titled Berserk: The Golden Age Arc – Memorial Edition (ベルセルク 黄金時代篇 MEMORIAL EDITION, Beruseruku Ōgon Jidai-hen Memoriaru Edishon). The series was featured at the Aniplex Online Fest 2022, held on September 23, 2022. It was directed by Yuta Sano and broadcast for 13 episodes on Tokyo MX, Tochigi TV, Gunma TV, BS11 and other networks from October 2 to December 25, 2022. (Note: Tokyo MX, Tochigi TV, Gunma TV and BS11 list the air dates for the series on Saturday at 24:30, which is effectively Sunday at 0:30 a.m. JST.) The episodes were released on a Blu-ray set on March 29, 2023.

It was streamed outside of Asia by Crunchyroll.

==== Episodes ====
No.	Title	Original release date
1	"The Golden Age"; Transliteration: "Ougonjidai" (Japanese: 黄金時代)	October 2, 2022
2	"Nosferatu Zodd"; Transliteration: "Fushi no Zoddo" (Japanese: 不死のゾッド)	October 9, 2022
3	"Master of the Sword"; Transliteration: "Ken no Nushi" (Japanese: 剣の主)	October 16, 2022
4	"Prepared for Death"; Transliteration: "Kesshikou" (Japanese: 決死行)	October 23, 2022
5	"Campfire of Dreams"; Transliteration: "Yume no Kagaribi" (Japanese: 夢のかがり火)	October 30, 2022
6	"The Battle for Doldrey"; Transliteration: "Dorudorei Kouryakusen" (Japanese: ドルドレイ 攻略戦)	November 5, 2022
7	"One Snowy Night"; Transliteration: "Aru Yuki no Yoru ni..." (Japanese: ある雪の夜に...)	November 12, 2022
8	"Demise of a Dream"; Transliteration: "Yume no Shuuen" (Japanese: 夢の終焉)	November 19, 2022
9	"Wounds"; Transliteration: "Kizu" (Japanese: 傷)	November 26, 2022
10	"Reunion in the Abyss"; Transliteration: "Shin'en no Saikai" (Japanese: 深淵の再会)	December 4, 2022
11	"Eclipse"; Transliteration: "Shoku" (Japanese: 蝕)	December 11, 2022
12	"Storm of Death"; Transliteration: "Shi no Arashi" (Japanese: 死の嵐)	December 18, 2022
13	"Vow of Retaliation"; Transliteration: "Hangeki no Chikai" (Japanese: 反撃の誓い)	December 25, 2022

== Music ==
The soundtracks for the film series are composed and arranged by Shirō Sagisu, with the theme song composed and arranged by Susumu Hirasawa. The insert song of all films, "Aria", is performed by Hirasawa, a live performance (from Phonon 2555 Vision) is included on the home video releases of the second film, another live version is on the Nomonos and Imium DVD; the ending theme of the first film, "Beautiful Things" (ウツクシキモノ, Utsukushii Mono), is performed by Japanese-American singer-songwriter Ai (in an uncharacteristic epic ballad style) and composed by Rykeyz and Redd Styiez; lastly, the ending theme of the third film, "Breakthrough", is performed by Kaname Kawabata of CHEMISTRY, written by Kawabata, Hidenori Tanaka and UTA, and arranged by Sagisu, Miho Hazama and CHOKKAKU. A special TV program, narrated by Akio Otsuka (the voice actor for the Skull Knight), that summarized the events of the first two movies, used the Hirasawa song "Horde of Thistledown" (冠毛種子の大群, "Kanmō Shushi no Taigun") (from The Secret of the Flowers of Phenomenon) as its ending theme.

The television broadcast version of the trilogy, Berserk: The Golden Age Arc – Memorial Edition, features an exclusive ending theme by Mika Nakashima, titled "Wish". It also features new music composed by Sagisu and Hirasawa.

== Reception ==
In Japan, Berserk: The Golden Age Arc I: The Egg of the King brought in $594,707 with a gross of $1,348,352. The last film in the trilogy brought in less, with an opening weekend of $280,248 and a gross of $399,445.

=== The Egg of the King ===
Ko Ransom of Anime News Network (ANN) gave the film a B+ and wrote, "This concise and well-adapted story results in an exciting, intense action tale full of intriguing characters and drama. Unfortunately, the decision to heavily utilize 3D CG throughout the movie drags the overall production down, but does not quite deal a fatal blow to the film, which despite this shortcoming should find a receptive audience from fans of the series and newcomers alike." Fellow ANN reviewer Carl Kimlinger, in a critique of the film's Blu-ray release, was similarly receptive, awarding both the Japanese version and the English dub a B and stating, "That The Egg of the King isn't crushed under the weight of our expectations is a testament to its strength. That it cannot in any way measure up to its progenitors is proof of its weakness. It is a good film, rousing and occasionally deeply felt, but also a truncated one—an introductory lesson in Berserkology that falls somewhere between the full version of Guts' saga and the Cliff's Notes." The film was deemed "one of the best animated action films of recent years" by Hugo Ozman of ScreenAnarchy.

Richard Eisenbeis, in a review written for Kotaku, lambasted the film, especially the pacing and computer-generated animation, and concluded, "As an adaptation of the Berserk story, it succeeds well enough; but as a piece of film making, it just fails. It is an ugly, poorly-paced wreck of cinematography." Dallas Marshall of THEM Anime Reviews was also critical of the "haphazard" CG animation and lack of character development, gave the film a score of 3/5, and concluded, "Do not think that this is a bad anime, it is a good one, but in hindsight it could have been a great one if some extra care was taken in terms of the art, and a little more time was taken to develop the overall story."

=== The Battle for Doldrey ===
Kotaku's Richard Eisenbeis enjoyed The Battle for Doldrey more than its predecessor, opining that it was "a great improvement over The Egg of the King in every conceivable way" and further stating, "And while I hesitate to call it a good movie, I certainly don't feel like I wasted time or money in seeing it." Darius Washington, in a review of the film and its predecessor written for Otaku USA, noted they had "a good balance of action and character development" and told "a pretty hard hitting story" but felt the "cleanliness" of the animation took away a bit from the "grit and hard edged brutality that the Berserk TV series had."

Rebecca Silverman of ANN criticized the film's computer-generated animation and "pervasive misogyny" but commended the character development, traditional animation, and voice acting and awarded The Battle for Doldrey a score of C+. Fellow ANN staffer Carl Kimlinger, in a review of the Blu-ray release, awarded a C to the Japanese version and a C+ to the English dub while noting that beneath its "thundering medieval warfare and gut-splattering violence" the film was an "emotionally impoverished facsimile, a wispy shadow of the rich stretch of deepening character and subtly shifting relationships that it adapts."

=== The Advent ===
Richard Eisenbeis of Kotaku, after panning the first film and offering moderate praise to the second, commended The Advent, which he labelled "the most graphic mainstream anime movie I have ever seen" while noting it delivered "an experience surpassing even the original manga in both emotional turmoil and eye-wrenching ultra-violence." Carl Kimlinger of ANN criticized many aspects of The Advent, such as the animation and the streamlining of the story, and deemed it an "inferior and redundant movie" and a "clunker" before giving the Japanese version a C+ and the English dub a B−.
