= Ice Nine (video game) =

2005 video game

- North American box art
- Developer: Torus Games
- Publisher: BAM! Entertainment
- Platform: Game Boy Advance
- Release: NA: February 28, 2005; EU: March 2005
- Genre: First-person shooter
- Modes: Single-player, multiplayer

Ice Nine is a first-person shooter video game for the Game Boy Advance. It was one of the final first-person shooters on the console. It was originally going to be a tie-in with the film The Recruit. However, this fell through, but the plot remains unchanged. There was also a planned PlayStation 2 version, but it was canceled at some point in development.

== Plot ==
The player prepares to shoot an enemy. Ice Nine features 3D graphics, unusual for the console.

The plot of Ice Nine is similar to the film The Recruit on which it was previously based. The player takes control of the recruit Tom Carter on a mission to stop an evil plot to steal the computer virus "Ice Nine". Over the course of the game, Carter unravels a conspiracy within the CIA.

== Development ==
Ice Nine was intended to be a tie-in for The Recruit, but the movie's commercial failure forced the game to change its title.

== Reception ==
Ice Nine was met with mediocre reviews. It was praised for its above-average graphics and music, but criticized for its boring level design in comparison with earlier shooters such as Ecks vs. Sever. It has a 44% overall average on GameRankings.
