= Planet Roll Call =

Studio album by Susumu Hirasawa
- Released: February 18, 2009
- Recorded: September 2008 – January 2009
- Studio: Studio WIRESELF
- Genre: Experimental pop; electropop
- Length: 43:47
- Label: Chaos Union (TESLAKITE) CHTE-0046
- Producer: Susumu Hirasawa

Susumu Hirasawa chronology
Byakkoya - White Tiger Field (2006)	Planet Roll Call (2009)	The Secret of The Flowers of Phenomenon (2012)

Planet Roll Call (点呼する惑星, Tenko Suru Wakusei) is the eleventh solo album by Susumu Hirasawa.

== Track listing ==
All tracks are written by Susumu Hirasawa.

No.	Title	Length
1.	"Hard Landing" (instrumental)	1:49
2.	"Planet Roll Call" (点呼する惑星 Tenko Suru Wakusei)	3:34
3.	"Night Walking Wearing the Human Body" (人体夜行 Jintai Yagyō)	5:02
4.	"Mirror Gate"	4:16
5.	"Royal Road, Paradise" (王道楽土 Ō Dō Rakudo)	5:14
6.	"Initial Value of Midair" (上空初期値 Jōkū Shokichi)	5:36
7.	"The Great Deceiver of Saint Horseshoe Planet" (聖馬蹄形惑星の大詐欺師 Sei Batei Kei Wakusei no Dai Sagishi)	3:21
8.	"Visible Sea" (可視海 Kashi Umi)	6:17
9.	"Phonon Belt"	4:32
10.	"Astro-Ho! Homing" (Astro-Ho!帰還 Astro-Ho! Kikan)	4:00
