= Blue Limbo =

Studio album by Susumu Hirasawa
- Released: February 13, 2003
- Recorded: 2002
- Studio: Studio WIRESELF 2002 Solar Version
- Genres: Art pop; electro-industrial; electropop
- Length: 47:21
- Labels: Chaos Union, TESLAKITE CHTE-0025
- Producer: Susumu Hirasawa

Susumu Hirasawa chronology
| Philosopher's Propeller (2000) | Blue Limbo (2003) | Byakkoya - White Tiger Field (2006) |

Blue Limbo is the ninth studio album by Susumu Hirasawa, released on February 13, 2003.

== Background ==
The dystopian themes of the album were influenced by the Iraq War and the remaining traces of the Cambodian Civil War. One day before its release, "High-Minded Castle" and a new re-recording of "Love Song" from Aurora were given away for free to be used as a way to protest against the American response to the September 11 attacks and the compliance of the Japanese government to those actions.

== Track listing ==
All tracks are written by Susumu Hirasawa.

| No. | Title | Length |
|---|---|---|
| 1. | "Grandfatherly Wind" (祖父なる風 Sofunaru Kaze) | 4:53 |
| 2. | "RIDE THE BLUE LIMBO" | 4:55 |
| 3. | "The Silent Gate of Tsiolkovsky Crater" (ツオルコフスキー・クレーターの無口な門 Tsuorukofusukī Kurētā no Mukuchi na Mon) | 5:20 |
| 4. | "CAMBODIAN LIMBO" | 5:29 |
| 5. | "Sailing Ship 108" (帆船108 Han Sen 108) | 4:09 |
| 6. | "The Sniper" (狙撃手 Sogeki Shu) | 3:31 |
| 7. | "LIMBO-54" (instrumental) | 4:49 |
| 8. | "HALO" | 4:39 |
| 9. | "High-Minded Castle" (高貴な城 Kōki na Shiro) | 5:43 |
| 10. | "Sathwan Calendar 8869" (サトワン暦8869年 Satowan Reki 8869 Nen) | 3:53 |
