= The Man Climbing the Hologram =

Studio album by Susumu Hirasawa
- Released: November 18, 2015
- Studio: Studio WIRESELF
- Genres: Art pop; electropop
- Labels: Chaos Union, TESLAKITE CHTE-0077
- Producer: Susumu Hirasawa

Susumu Hirasawa chronology
The Secret of the Flowers of Phenomenon (2012)	The Man Climbing the Hologram (2015)	Beacon (2021)

The Man Climbing the Hologram (ホログラムを登る男, Horoguramu wo Noboru Otoko) is the thirteenth solo album by Susumu Hirasawa.

== Background ==
In April 2015, the alternate reality game Samurai Facing the Past: The machinations in the Psi'gahara Field (過去向く士(さむらい)・Ψ(プシー)ヶ原の策謀, Kako Muku Samurai – Pushī'gahara no sakubō) was started on Hirasawa's website. It segued into the story of the album's Interactive Live Show concerts held a week after the album's release.

== Track listing ==
All tracks are written by Susumu Hirasawa.

No.	Title	Length
1.	"Adios" (アディオス Adiosu)	4:11
2.	"Avatar Alone" (アヴァター・アローン Avatā Arōn)	5:21
3.	"The Time being Proud of its Heterogeneity" (異種を誇る「時」 Ishu wo Hokoru "Toki")	4:38
4.	"MURAMASA"	4:13
5.	"Wi-SiWi"	3:25
6.	"Circuit OFF Circuit ON" (回路OFF回路ON Kairo OFF Kairo ON)	3:47
7.	"Qualia Tower" (クオリア塔 Kuoria Tō) (LG-G version)	5:32
8.	"Sally at the Fire" (火事場のサリー Kajiba no Sarī)	3:33
9.	"The Man Climbing the Hologram" (ホログラムを登る男 Horoguramu wo Noboru Otoko)	5:33
10.	"The Iron Cutting Song (The Man Climbing an Iron Mountain)" (鉄切り歌（鉄山を登る男） Tetsu Kiri Uta (Tetsuyama wo Noboru Otoko))	5:52
11.	"Qualia Tower" (クオリア塔 Kuoria Tō) (HG-G version) (bonus track)	5:33

TESLAKITE karaoke CD
No.	Title	Length
1.	"Avatar Alone" (アヴァター・アローン Avatā Arōn)	5:22
2.	"The Man Climbing the Hologram" (ホログラムを登る男 Horoguramu wo Noboru Otoko)	5:35
3.	"The Iron Cutting Song (The Man Climbing an Iron Mountain)" (鉄切り歌（鉄山を登る男） Tetsu Kiri Uta (Tetsuyama wo Noboru Otoko))	4:46

Green Nerve special MP3
No.	Title	Length
1.	"Qualia Tower" (クオリア塔 Kuoria Tō) (MG-G version)	5:36

== Personnel ==
- Susumu Hirasawa – Vocals, Guitars, Keyboards, Personal computer, Digital audio workstation, Synthesizers, Sampler, Sequencer, Programming, Production
- Kenji "sato-ken" Sato – Backing Vocals on "The Iron Cutting Song (The Man Climbing an Iron Mountain)"
- Masanori Chinzei – Recording, Mixing, Mastering
- Toshifumi Nakai – Design
- Syotaro Takami, Grae – Translation
- Presented by Chaos Union/TESLAKITE: Mika Hirano, Rihito Yumoto, Kinuko Mochizuki and Hyūga Yukino

== Chart performance ==
Chart	Peak position
Oricon Albums Chart	32
Oricon Indie Albums Chart	3
amazon.co.jp dance/electronica sales ranking	1
