= Gipnoza =

Studio album by Kaku P-Model
- Released: November 6, 2013
- Studio: Studio WIRESELF
- Genre: Synthpop; EBM
- Length: 38:33
- Label: Chaos Union, TESLAKITE CHTE-0073
- Producer: Susumu Hirasawa

Kaku P-Model chronology
Vistoron (2004)	Gipnoza (2013)	Kai=Kai (2018)

Gipnoza (Russian: гипноза) is the second album by Kaku P-Model.

== Overview ==
The 2011 Tōhoku earthquake was worked in as a plot device for the album's dystopian science fiction concept story, a sequel to the events of Vistoron, in which the reality-distorting Gipnoza nanobots are being planted inside of people through the food and medicine supply. Other story elements were taken from the 1996 album Convex And Concave by the P-Model/Devo tribute band Pevo.

Yasumi Tanaka, a founding member of P-Model, returned 30 years after his departure from music as a guest performer on "Go for it! Halycon". Pevo's 1go also appeared as a guest musician on "Time-eliminating Light", and performed alongside Susumu Hirasawa at the album's Parallel Kozak live concerts.

== Track listing ==
All tracks are written by Susumu Hirasawa.

No.	Title	Length
1.	"Gipnoza" (гипноза, hypnosis)	4:04
2.	"Go for it! Halycon" (それ行け！Halycon Sore ike! Halycon)	2:39
3.	"Time-eliminating Light" (排時光 Hai Jikō)	3:52
4.	"White and Huge" (白く巨大で Shiroku Kyodai de)	4:26
5.	"Dμ34=Immortality" (Dμ34=不死 Dμ34=Fushi)	3:53
6.	"Dr.Drevniye" (Dr.древние)	4:29
7.	"Parallel Kozak" (instrumental)	2:49
8.	"Alarm"	4:19
9.	"The Flood of District 109" (109号区の氾濫 109-Gō-Ku no Hanran)	3:36
10.	"East of Timeline" (Timelineの東 Timeline no Higashi)	4:20

The tracks with Cyrillic words in their titles are stylized with the Cyrillic word first, followed by the Latin equivalent in brackets.

== Personnel ==
- Susumu Hirasawa - All instruments, Programming, Production
- Yasumi Tanaka - Electronic keyboard solo on "Go for it! Halycon"
- Pevo 1go - Right channel electric guitar on "Time-eliminating Light"
- Masanori Chinzei - Mixing, Mastering
- Syotaro Takami - Translation
- Toshifumi "non graph" Nakai - Design
- Presented by Chaos Union/TESLAKITE: Kenji Sato, Rihito Yumoto, Mika Hirano, Kinuko Mochizuki, Misato Oguro
