= Kai=Kai =

Studio album by Kaku P-Model
- Released: 5 September 2018
- Studio: Studio Wireself
- Genre: Alternative dance; surf rock; Electronic body music
- Length: 41:10
- Label: Chaos Union, TESLAKITE CHTE-0081
- Producer: Susumu Hirasawa

Kaku P-Model chronology
| Gipnoza (2013) | Kai=Kai (2018) | unZIP (2025) |

Kai equal Kai (回＝回, Kai ikōru Kai) is the third album by Kaku P-Model.

== Overview ==
Based on a concept, divorced from the story built upon in previous Kaku P-Model albums, centered on changing away from stagnating customs so that humans stop being "limited editions" of themselves, Kai=Kai presents modern electronic music mixed in with prominent guitar playing, where Susumu Hirasawa adopts tones that harken back to his roots in surf music.

The production of the album marked the first time Kaku P-Model material was created to be used as soundtrack music: Hirasawa has affirmed that a movie adaptation of the Satoshi Kon manga Opus will feature music by him, with the song of the same name to serve that purpose.

== Track listing ==
All tracks are written by Susumu Hirasawa.

| No. | Title | Length |
|---|---|---|
| 1. | "Kai=Kai" (回＝回) (instrumental) | 3:34 |
| 2. | "Shagan Daishi" (遮眼大師) | 3:20 |
| 3. | "Opus" | 5:07 |
| 4. | "Travelator" | 3:09 |
| 5. | "Other Breathing Yuria" (亜呼吸ユリア Akokyū Yuria) | 4:36 |
| 6. | "A Message from the Headless Knight" (無頭騎士の伝言 Mugashira Kishi no Dengon) | 4:16 |
| 7. | "Echo-233" | 6:41 |
| 8. | "Ghost Aeroplane" (幽霊飛行機 Yūrei Hikōki) | 3:52 |
| 9. | "Planet-Home" | 5:29 |
| 10. | "Human-LE" | 4:42 |

TESLAKITE karaoke CD
| No. | Title | Length |
|---|---|---|
| 1. | "Ghost Aeroplane" (幽霊飛行機 Yūrei Hikōki) | 3:52 |
| 2. | "Planet-Home" | 5:29 |
| 3. | "Human-LE" | 4:42 |

== Personnel ==
- Susumu Hirasawa - Vocals, All instruments, Programming, Production
- Masanori Chinzei - Mixing, Mastering
- Syotaro Takami, Grae - Translation
- Toshifumi Nakai - Design
- Presented by Chaos Union/TESLAKITE: Rihito Yumoto, Mika Hirano, Kinuko Mochizuki, Yukino Hinata

== Chart performance ==
| Chart | Peak position |
|---|---|
| Oricon Albums Chart | 26 |
| Oricon Indie Albums Chart | 1 |
