= Solidify =

Solidify may refer to:

- Solidify (Grip Inc. album), the third album from heavy metal band Grip Inc.
- Solidify, an album by American Idol contestant Amanda Overmyer
- The verb form of solidification (turning into a solid):
  - Freezing, the solidification of a liquid
  - Deposition (phase transition), solidification of a gas
  - Crystallization, solidification that results in highly ordered structures
