= Sim City (album) =

Studio album by Susumu Hirasawa
- Released: August 2, 1995
- Recorded: August 1994 – March 1995
- Studios: Various: Landmark Studio, Minato Mirai 21, Yokohama, Kanagawa; Woodstock Studio, Karuizawa, Kitasaku, Nagano; Center Stage Recording, Bangkok; Wire Self Studio, Yoyogi, Shibuya, Tokyo; Tokyu Fun Digital Mastering Room (mast.), Dōgenzaka, Shibuya, Tokyo
- Genres: Art pop; electronic; world
- Length: 49:49
- Languages: Japanese, Thai
- Label: Polydor K.K.
- Producers: Susumu Hirasawa; Yūichi Kenjo (co.)

Susumu Hirasawa chronology
Aurora (1994)	Sim City (1995)	Siren (1996)

Sim City is the fifth studio album by Japanese musician and composer Susumu Hirasawa, released on August 2, 1995 via Polydor K.K. This is his last record with Polydor, as he would later switch record labels to Nippon Columbia.

== Overview ==
In 1994, Susumu Hirasawa got the suggestion to try a Pink Floyd-like sound for his next solo album from his neighbor, Doll Magazine editor-in-chief Mikio Moriwaki. His original plan was to make a '90s version of The Dark Side of the Moon, which would cover similar ground to Virtual Rabbit.

Sometime afterward, he came up with the idea of the World Inspection Tour (万国点検隊, Bankoku Tenken Tai), a role-playing game held in an overseas country for members of his official fan club Hirasawa Bypass. It was decided that it would happen in the Thai city of Phuket, since the airplane trip would be short and it didn't have a lot of Japanese tourism; because of that lack of Japanese reference, Hirasawa took a trial visit to see if it would be a good place for the tour, his first time in the country.

He had no idea what to expect and had something like the Vietnam War in mind, but on that night he attended a show at the Simon Cabaret, performed by a cast consisting entirely of the country's Kathoey people, and that was formative on his impression of Thai culture. He befriended them through subsequent trips to the country, through which he got fascinated with their way of being, as well as the socio-technological disparities he saw in Bangkok. The cultural shock experienced with these trips affected Hirasawa profoundly, and he took to composing, writing and recording in the Thai capital.

Due to the irresponsible nature of the Thai studio used and Hirasawa's lack of trust of their dealing with his gear, he only brought 24-track instrumental recordings on reels of analog tape with him to the country for work, and the only material recorded there were vocals both his and from Thai performers over a 4-day span. Although Hirasawa is not proficient in Thai, he wrote some of the lyrics in it by cross-referencing four language guidebooks, but the meaning of what he originally wrote was completely different from what he wanted to convey, which led to on-the-fly rewriting of both lyrics and melodies.

On the storyline of the album and accompanying Interactive Live Show, a futuristic Thailand is portrayed as a simulation city. Although "Sim City" is a play on "Siam City", Hirasawa doesn't actually regard Thailand a Sim City as conceived; it is a concept from within him that was inspired there. Because of this, the album is not "world music", but a manifestation of his inner space combined with cyberspace, or rather "fake" world music that provides a simulation of no particular location.

The photoshoot for the album's booklet took place in Thailand and is the only one made for a Hirasawa solo album where he isn't the only person in the photos. Hirasawa and Simon Cabaret performer Miss N. are shown in nature spots, an urban area and a wat. Miss N. wears a veil made out of MIDI cables in some of the photos, among them the one used as the album's cover.

== Track listing ==
All tracks are written by Susumu Hirasawa, except "Recall", "Sim City" and "Prologue", with lyrics by Hirasawa and Miss N.

No.	Title	Length
1.	"Recall"	1:23
2.	"Archetype Engine"	4:42
3.	"Lotus"	4:26
4.	"Kingdom"	5:16
5.	"Echoes (CHARAN SANITWONG 24)"	6:19
6.	"Sim City"	5:04
7.	"Moonlight" (月の影 Tsuki no Kage)	6:11
8.	"Pacific Rim Imitation Network" (環太平洋擬装網 Kantai Heiyō Gisō Mō)	3:28
9.	"Colony"	4:50
10.	"Caravan"	5:48
11.	"Prologue"	2:19

"Echoes" only appears with the subtitle on the album's lyric sheet. Outside of the title and the Pink Floyd connection, the song bears no relation to the track of the same name from Another Game.

== Personnel ==
- Susumu Hirasawa - vocals, electric guitar (Fernandes PHOTON), synthesizers (E-mu Proteus/2, Korg M1R, Roland JD-800), Miburi, sampler (Akai S1100), drum machine (Roland R-8 with DANCE card), Amiga (2500), Vista, sequencer (Bars&Pipes Professional), programming, production

additional performers

- Miss N. (Phuket Simon Cabaret) - narration on "Recall", "Sim City" (uncredited) and "Prologue"; cover photo model
- Wisakha Fraytes - vocals on "Sim City"

technical

- Masanori Chinzei - recording, mixing
- Naoyuki Kamijo (Otoya), Hajime Nagai (Z's), Tomoko Yamashita (Z's), Tum (Center Stage) - assistant engineering
- Keiko Ueda - mastering

visuals

- Kiyoshi Inagaki (tristero design) - art direction, design
- Kasiko Takahasi - Thai-like typeface design
- Hideki Namai - photography
- Akemi Tsujitani - styling

operations

- Kenji Sato (FI-Mode) - Thailand session coordinator
- Wai Rachatachotic - Thailand session guide
- Roppei Iwagami (Pre-Octave) - publishing
- I_{3} Promotion - artist management
  - Yūichi Kenjo - co-production
  - Koosuke Mogi - personal manager
  - Masami Fujii - A&R coordination
- Polydor K.K.
  - Osamu Takeuchi - direction
  - Kenji Saiki - promotional staff

Thanks

- Phuket Simon Cabaret
  - Miss. Dawe, Mr. Neng
- Fernandes
- Korg
- Hirasawa Bypass
- Photon

== Release history ==
Date	Label(s)	Format	Catalog	Notes
August 2, 1995	Polydor K.K.	CD	POCH-1510	
July 1, 2005	Universal Music Japan, Universal Sigma	Digital Download	none	
February 29, 2012	Chaos Union, Teslakite	CD	CHTE-0058	Remastered by Masanori Chinzei. Disc 5 of the HALDYN DOME box set.
November 5, 2014	Universal Music Japan	SHM-CD	UPCY-6931	Part of Universal's "Project Archetype" (supervised by Osamu Takeuchi & Kasiko Takahasi). Remastered by Kenji Yoshino (supervised by Chinzei) with both original liner notes and new ones.

- "Archetype Engine", "Lotus", "Kingdom" and "Pacific Rim Imitation Network" were included on the Archetype | 1989-1995 Polydor years of Hirasawa compilation.
- "Recall" is included in the vinyl release of the Ruiner Original Soundtrack.
