= Ice-nine =

Fictional form of water

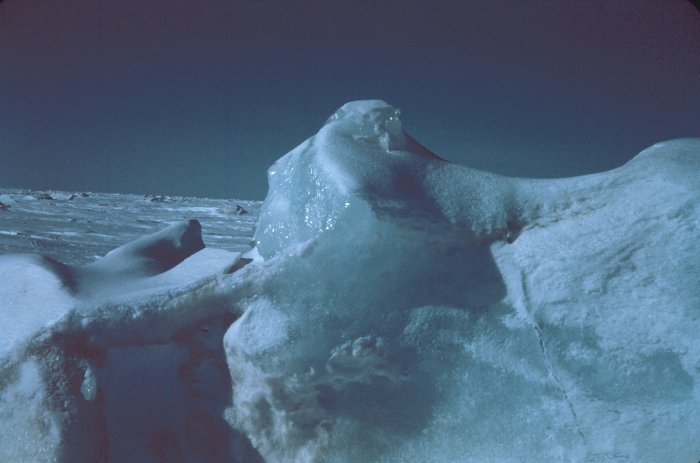
The fictional ice-nine is depicted as being capable of causing any liquid water to permanently freeze unless heated far above room temperature.

Ice-nine is a fictional material that appears in Kurt Vonnegut's 1963 novel Cat's Cradle. Ice-nine is described as a polymorph of ice which instead of melting at 0°C (32°F) melts at 45.8°C (114.4°F). When ice-nine comes into contact with liquid water below 45.8°C, it acts as a seed crystal and causes the solidification of the entire body of water, which quickly crystallizes as more ice-nine. As humans are 55-60% water, ice-nine kills nearly instantly when ingested or brought into contact with soft tissues exposed to the bloodstream, such as the eyes or lips.

In the story, ice-nine is invented by Dr. Felix Hoenikker while working on the Manhattan Project in response to a suggestion from a Marine general, who complained about soldiers having to deal with mud on the battlefield. The project is abandoned when it becomes clear that any quantity of the substance would have the power to destroy all life on Earth, though a small amount of ice-nine is kept in a sealed vessel. In the novel's climax, the Earth's oceans are accidentally frozen solid by ice-nine, prompting a doomsday scenario.

Vonnegut encountered the idea of ice-nine while working at General Electric. He attributes the idea of ice-nine to his brother Bernard Vonnegut, who was researching the formation of ice crystals in the atmosphere. A later account of the events attributes the idea to the chemist Irving Langmuir, who devised the concept while helping H.G. Wells conceive ideas for stories. Vonnegut decided to adapt the idea into a story after Langmuir's death in 1957.

== Real-life analogues ==
The phase transitions without any thermal effect and into the state of lower entropy described in the book are purely fictional and impossible according to current theories of physics. In the assumption that the phase transition was described inaccurately and has thermal effects (which were not described within the novel), it would have happened without any outside intervention. The initial seed being nucleated spontaneously was due to fluctuations that are always present, the same way that the ordinary liquid-solid transitions happen. Supercooling is only possible when nucleation cannot occur, which is difficult in normal circumstances due to natural impurities in water.

While multiple polymorphs of ice exist, none have the properties described in the novel, and none are stable at standard temperature and pressure. The real Ice IX has none of the properties of Vonnegut's creation, and can exist only at extremely low temperatures and high pressures. Ice VII is stable at room temperature, but only under very high pressures.

The ice-nine-like phenomenon has occurred with a few other kinds of crystals, called "disappearing polymorphs". In these cases, a new variant of a crystal has been introduced into an environment, replacing many of the older form crystals with its own form. One example is the anti-AIDS medicine ritonavir, where the newer polymorph destroyed the effectiveness of the drug in solid form, requiring a change to the less efficacious liquid form.

The ice-nine-like phenomenon is referrable to the tin pest process, occurring when a β-form white tin due to low temperature decomposes into an α-form grey tin, which leads to turning the solid sample into powder. The grey tin, while being a result of decomposition, is also a catalyst for even quicker tin pest appear, which eventually leads the entire construction made of tin to decompose.

Ice-nine has been used as a model to explain the infective mechanism of mis-folded proteins called prions which are thought to catalyze the mis-folding of the corresponding normal protein leading to a variety of spongiform encephalopathies such as kuru, scrapie and Creutzfeldt–Jakob disease.

== Critical analysis ==
In Posthumanism in the Novels of Kurt Vonnegut, ice-nine is described as an example of a wampeter in the fictional Bokononism religion, the pivot around which a karass, or a group of randomly interrelated people, revolves. Calling it both the cause of the apocalypse and one of the book's main sources of humor, the book argues that ice-nine sets the entire tone for the novel, which is "rendered inert" by its fragmentary structure and fundamental tension. The book also states that ice-nine reverses the normal hierarchy in which living organisms use water as a resource, becoming the "successor of organic life on planet Earth".

Theoretical physicist and expert on string theory Leonard Susskind, in his book The Cosmic Landscape, calls Cat's Cradle and its use of ice-nine a "cautionary tale about madness and instability in a world full of nuclear weapons", as well as being based on the real scientific principle of metastability. Saying that: while in the real world liquid water at room temperature is stable, he explains that in Vonnegut's universe, normal water is only metastable, and since ice-nine is more stable than water, it will form naturally "sooner or later" even without the introduction of the seed crystal. It describes the fact that supercooled water takes on similar traits, and will completely freeze if a normal chunk of ice is introduced. The book also relates this to the metastability of vacuums in string theory and their ability to create a diverse universe.

In Dr. Strangelove's America, Margot A. Henriksen states that ice-nine represents a collaboration between science and the military that, as with the atomic bomb, proves their "indifference to the fate of the human race", and the "inhuman and immoral results of [...] pure research". The book notes that the pure search for knowledge without "living human principles" as depicted in Cat's Cradle ultimately tarnishes science.

== See also ==
- Crystal growth
- Gray goo
- Ice Nine Kills
- List of fictional doomsday devices
- Polywater
- Strangelet
- The Crystal World
