= ICE-9 (album) =

Instrumental album by Susumu Hirasawa

Studio album by Susumu Hirasawa
- Released: 31 August 2005
- Studio: Studio WIRESELF 2002 Solar Version
- Genre: Ambient
- Label: Chaos Union, TESLAKITE CHTE-0033
- Producer: Susumu Hirasawa

ICE-9 is an instrumental album by Susumu Hirasawa.

Its title is an allusion to the 1963 science fiction novel Cat's Cradle by Kurt Vonnegut.

== Track listing ==
1. Eurasia 21 °C (ユーラシア21°C, Yuurashia21°C)
2. A Pool in the Ruins (廃墟の水溜り, Haikyo no Mizu Tamari)
3. A Full of Metal in the Lungs (肺いっぱいの金属, Hai Ippai no Kinzoku)
4. Nice Nice Very Nice
5. Will you open the capsule? (カプセルを開けますか?, Kapuseru wo Akemasu ka?)
