= Susumu Hirasawa =

Japanese musician (born 1954)

Susumu Hirasawa 平沢進
- Also known as: Shiro Sakata, Stealthman (ステルスマン), Half-Mother (異母犯妙)
- Born: April 2, 1954 (age 72); Adachi, Tokyo, Japan
- Origin: Tokyo, Japan
- Genres: Electronica; art pop; experimental; ambient; classical crossover; rock; world; new-age; electro-pop; synth-pop
- Occupations: Musician; singer-songwriter; arranger; producer; CG artist
- Instruments: Vocals; guitar; keyboards
- Years active: 1972–present
- Labels: Polydor K.K. (1989–1995); Nippon Columbia (1996–1998); Teslakite (1996–present); Chaos Union (1997–present)
- Website: 平沢進 Susumu Hirasawa (P-MODEL) Official site

Japanese name
- Kanji: 平沢 進
- Hiragana: ひらさわ すすむ
- Katakana: ヒラサワ ススム
Transcriptions
- Romanization: Hirasawa Susumu

Susumu Hirasawa (平沢進, Hirasawa Susumu; born April 2, 1954) is a Japanese musician and composer. He is well known for his work for the films of director Satoshi Kon and the animated adaptations of the Berserk manga series, alongside his work as a solo artist and as the lead member of P-Model.

== Early life ==
Hirasawa was born on April 2, 1954, to his father Kiyoshi (平沢 清), a firefighter as well as a calligrapher. Under the penname "Hōseki" (峰石), he wrote the names of album and band for the cover art of the P-Model album Potpourri. Hirasawa lived with his older brother, artist Yūichi (平沢 裕一, born October 5, 1950), who goes by the moniker "YOU1". He formed a stage effects team for Mandrake and appeared at the band's final show, running on a treadmill. Yūichi was P-Model's art director for the band's first 9 years of existence, and has done occasional artwork for his brother from 2013 onwards. His only musical credits are for writing the lyrics of "For Kids" and "Sunshine City" (from In a Model Room), and for doing backing vocals on "Rocket" (from The Ghost in Science).

Since childhood, Hirasawa had an interest in machinery, and thought of himself as an engineer. He was an RC plane enthusiast, wanting to be a pilot, and repaired broken devices like radios and flashlights given to him by his parents. He studied in the electronics department of Honjo Technical High School, where he was the first to finish the graduation project, the construction of a TV, despite the fact he did not fully understand the circuits. He also had motocross as a hobby.

He enrolled in the Tokyo Designer Gakuin College in 1972 and graduated cum laude in 1975 from the university's interior design course. According to the Tokyo Designers' Gakuin College '75 Design Annual, his graduation project was a dome-shaped stage set hall for Tangerine Dream's performances.

== Career ==
In his fifth year of elementary school, Hirasawa learned to play the electric guitar, inspired by the surf and instrumental rock bands he heard on the radio and on TV, later joining his junior high school's band. In 1973 he formed Mandrake, a progressive rock band that incorporated elements from heavy metal and krautrock together. Being one of the few Japanese progressive rock bands of its time, Mandrake achieved little success and released no albums during its lifetime.

During the early days of Mandrake, he worked as a part-time carrier on a fruits and vegetables market during the morning and at a Pepsi warehouse during the night, alongside Mandrake co-founder Fumiyasu Abe. In 1978, Hirasawa applied for a part-time lecturer position at Yamaha Music Foundation, and got the job, as he was the only person who applied. He taught courses at the Yamaha Synthesizer School until 1983, and met various musicians that he would later collaborate with through these lectures. After leaving his position as teacher, he took to making commercial jingles for the rest of the decade to make ends meet.

After discovering punk rock and working on synthesizer-heavy projects, Hirasawa decided to change the band into the electronic rock band P-Model in 1979. Initially met with success, they changed to the unpopular post-punk and experimental rock genres after Hirasawa went through an adverse reaction to his fame. With Hirasawa at the forefront, the band went through various lineups and achieved some popularity in the Japanese independent music scene.

In 1989, Hirasawa launched his solo career with the release of the album Water in Time and Space. His music incorporated elements from other genres, alongside themes from philosophy and psychology. He continued to change his musical style while concurrently working with two different iterations of P-Model until the group was disbanded in 2000. He has been actively releasing new music since then.

== Compositions ==
Hirasawa's music takes from such concepts as analytical psychology, advances in digital technology, the philosophies of yin and yang and principles of nature versus machines. As a fan of science fiction novels since the 1970s and an eclectic reader overall, he's been inspired by the works of Frank Herbert, Carl Jung, Hayao Kawai, Kenji Miyazawa, George Orwell, Wilhelm Reich, Antoine de Saint-Exupéry, Theodore Sturgeon, Nikola Tesla and Kurt Vonnegut.

A constant source of inspiration for his music has come from Thailand. On a 1994 trip to Phuket, Hirasawa went through a "Thai shock", amazed by the country's culture, namely its transgender cabaret performers, some of whom he would invite to be singers on his albums and guest performers in his concerts throughout his career. After many trips back to the country Hirasawa grew to be increasingly identified with the Thai trans community, incorporating their problems and experiences in society into his work.

On having his music categorized based on western trends, Hirasawa has said:

"I dislike it when I hear someone describe [my music] as weird rock, or weird techno. Surely this genre is hard to define in the music scene, because it doesn't meet the standard of Western music charts. Hence if a rock music critic attempts to judge me [and my music], all they come up with is ambient music, or music to take drugs to. [The Japanese music scene] doesn't help with introducing terms such as New Age or transpersonality. I want to let my music reach a broader part of society, being music born from Japanese culture, and I think this is why I want to connect to the world that doesn't exist in the music scene."

== Performances ==
For every main solo album he releases, Hirasawa also stages an accompanying "Interactive Live Show", an interactive concert that merges computer graphics with his music to tell a story. The flow of each show is determined by audience participation; for example, Interactive Live Show 2000 Philosopher's Propeller was formatted as a maze, and the audience was asked to choose which direction to go in. Provided with phone numbers to four cellular phones during one song, the audience was allowed to call the numbers to have Hirasawa play the corresponding ringtones. This created an improvised harmony between the background music and the ringing phones. Since 1998, participation has been possible through the internet.

Hirasawa's live music is built on samples he activates with various hand-crafted machines and pre-recorded tracks without vocals. For the Solar Live concerts, he used solar power and a power-generating wheel as the source of energy for his electronic equipment.

Hirasawa has worked since the start of his solo career to decrease the amount of performers around himself. Most of his solo albums from 1992 onwards feature no guest musicians, and live backing bands were relinquished in 1994. Since then, only a few select shows have had guest singers or backing instrumentalists.

== Equipment usage ==
Hirasawa is known for his eclectic choice of instrumentation. Some of the instruments he built himself, being inspired by his background in engineering and machinery.

=== Guitars ===
Hirasawa has favored guitars designed specifically by Japanese instrument manufacturers. With a movement in the early '80s of electric guitar makers moving away from mass-producing copies of foreign designs and towards original ones, Hirasawa played many unique models. Over a five-year period, from Mandrake's last days to the early P-Model phase, he used the H.S. Anderson Rider, Fernandes Art Wave and ESP Random Star, painting them in bright colors (burgundy, yellow, blue and white). In 1983 he settled on Tōkai Gakki's Talbo aluminum guitars as his main ones, attracted by their unique material and design. He used multiple Tōkai Talbos over an eleven-year period, with the guitar becoming an integral part of his image.

After Tōkai discontinued production and customer support for the Talbo due to financial difficulties in the mid-'90s, Hirasawa requested Fernandes to make him a guitar of his design in 1994 called PHOTON, a Talbo-shaped guitar with a wooden body. In 2004, he requested TALBO Secret FACTORY, a manufacturer of Talbos run by other musicians who also liked the guitar and wanted to continue to use it, to build a Talbo of his own design, called ICE-9 (named after the material of the same name from Kurt Vonnegut's novel Cat's Cradle). It became Hirasawa's main guitar for the next eight years. To showcase it, he made an eponymous mini-album in 2005.

Hirasawa has continued to work with the TALBO Secret FACTORY, requesting the conversion of one of his early Tōkai models into a new design of his, the ASTRO, in 2011 and asking for the renewal of the PHOTON with new specifications after two decades of usage. In 2012, Secret FACTORY co-founder HISASHI gifted him a Talbo of his own design, the EVO 0101Z, which Hirasawa adopted as his new main guitar, owning standard copies as well as two equipped with single coil guitar pickups for selective usage.

Besides those, Hirasawa has also used different types of guitar for specific purposes, playing MIDI guitars like the Ibanez X-ING IMG-2010 and Casio MG500, various acoustic and classical models, classic surf ones like the Mosrite and the Jaguar, and the Aria AS-100C/SPL silent guitar.

=== Electronics ===
Hirasawa has used Amiga computers extensively in his work, starting out with CG production in 1987, and later on applying it on his albums and live shows, using applications such as Say, SCALA, Bars & Pipes, SuperJAM! and OctaMED. He stopped using Amigas with the LIMBO-54 shows of 2003 and the Byakkoya/Paprika albums of 2006, since "maintaining an Amiga now is, like maintaining a classic car, costly". (Note: "今やAmigaを維持するのはクラッシックカーを維持するようなもので、コストがかかりすぎます。")

In the '90s he started a gradual transition to Microsoft Windows (later on dabbling in Ubuntu for a time), using programs such as Delay Lama, Vocaloids, Bars'n'Pipes (an unofficial continuation of the Amiga program), Cakewalk Sonar and Synth1.

When choosing string tones Hirasawa aims to find ones with unstable pitches and a "dark sound", which he finds harmonious, such as the Mellotron, Kurzweil synths and EASTWEST's line of Symphonic sounds.

=== Recording/production ===
In the '90s, Hirasawa gradually moved his work from professional facilities to home, dubbing his workspace on various residences "Studio WIRESELF". He finally moved completely to it by the recording of 2000's Philosopher's Propeller. The following year he undertook the sustainable energy project "Hirasawa Energy Works" and changed his lifestyle so that all his music would be recorded with solar energy. To reduce carbon emission, Studio WIRESELF was outfitted to be powered completely by a photovoltaic system of 2 solar panels, with 2 car batteries to store extra energy. Years later, Hirasawa added 2 more panels to the studio and retired the batteries.

Initially Studio WIRESELF operated on large pieces of equipment, both analog and digital. With the advances of technology and the streamlining of production under Hirasawa Energy Works, the working landscape transitioned to software synthesizers, with the physical elements of the studio reduced to one recording booth and two workstations, one for Hirasawa and the other for engineer Masanori Chinzei.

== Activism and charity ==
In 1988, Hirasawa sold a Cassette Book at a flea market in Yoyogi for charity. It contained three original songs made specifically for the release and came with a thirty-six-page long booklet containing an analysis of his dreams and his current experience. All proceeds were donated to the Human Earth – Awakening Village (人間大地・めざめの里, Ningen Daichi Mezame no Sato) volunteering welfare facility for the mentally ill in Gunma Prefecture, founded by the psychologist who gave Hirasawa counseling around the time he made the P-Model albums Scuba and Karkador.

In 2001, a pregnant stray cat appeared in Hirasawa's studio. He took care of her and helped carry out four of her pregnancies from 2001 to 2002. Since he could not take care of all the kittens, Hirasawa created a temporary site to recruit possible adopters and keep up with the welfare of the various cats.

As Hirasawa objected to the American response after the September 11 attacks, which he believes involved excessive carnage, and the Japanese government's aiding of such actions, he offered downloads of online banners and two of his songs for free, which he hoped would be used as tools of objection. One of them is a rerecording of 1994's "Love Song", which is about children in the battlefield; the other is "High-Minded Castle", about a man who "can not know the truth and true background through media, he tries to face the real tragedy on the other side of the world". The latter was taken from the Blue Limbo album, which displays a dystopian theme partly influenced by the American government's retaliation.

To support freelance journalists, independent and citizen media, Hirasawa started a free music archive to be used by independent news as background music. He sent e-mails to various associates and members of P-Model requesting involvement, the only one to join was guitarist PEVO 1go. The files uploaded were instrumental mixes of songs by both musicians, including some from Vistoron, which revolves around the propagation of a false reality by mass media.

In the aftermath of the 2011 Tōhoku earthquake and tsunami and the Fukushima Daiichi nuclear disaster, Hirasawa started traveling around the country with a Geiger counter, measuring the radiation levels and reporting them in his Twitter account. In June 2011, a song was posted on his site, titled "Nuclear Power" (原子力, Genshiryoku): A rerecording of the P-Model song "Boat" (from 1984's Scuba) in the style of "The Aggregated Past – Kangen Shugi 8760 Hours" project, with the lyrics changed to protest against Japan's use of nuclear power and to criticize the government and the media. The song, credited to "Stealthman", was only available on the site for six days, but could be redistributed if unaltered and not for profit. An instrumental mix was posted on the site by Hirasawa after the original was taken down, following the same distribution guidelines. As these events occurred, Hirasawa told a story on Twitter of being assaulted and having his computer and website hacked by "Stealthman". Through his tweets and the way the posts were worded on his website, Hirasawa effectively distanced himself from the track and disowned it. The song is available on the karaoke service provider Xing's JoySound online song library, credited to "Stealthman".

== Personal life ==
In 2013, Yūichi opened the café bar Gazio in Tsukuba. Although branded as a "new wave" café, the establishment was heavily themed around P-Model and Hirasawa's discography; it contained various band related memorabilia, served original cocktails titled after his songs and often held special events and shows by members and associates of the band. Hirasawa made exclusive content for it and, as he gives his brother most things he has no need for at a given moment, many studio and stage objects were displayed in the café. Gazio ceased operations as an active restaurant in 2015 and rebranded as an art studio; Yūichi now holds twice monthly "Café Gazio" events in Kichijōji.

Hirasawa started smoking in 1979 and quit in 2001; he has since become an avid user of electronic cigarettes. He is also a teetotaler, since drinking more than one fifth of beer makes him feel like his head grows "...five times bigger, then explode." Despite this, he previously drank wine before singing in order to preserve his voice; he has since replaced this with throat lozenges.

Hirasawa is a vegetarian, as he has remarked before, "At any rate, meat is unappetizing and gross. Eating meat makes me tired and makes me throw up". He lives in a house in Tsukuba with his pet calico cat named Tebin (テビン). His house also has a garden, where he grows some of his food. He also cultivates bacteria to make soy yogurt.

While repeatedly incorporating various concepts from Shintoism, Buddhism, and, more notably, Jungian Psychology in his themes, Hirasawa has never specified what his beliefs are.

In one 1988 interview, he suggested the return of the imperial cult of the Emperor of Japan as a psychological measure: "[...] My way of thinking leans toward the right. I believe the Emperor should regain his symbolic status as a deity. Though, my intention is that this is for the healthy functioning of the collective psyche. So please, don't conflate this with all that talk about militarism etc."

== Discography ==
=== Studio albums ===
- Water in Time and Space (時空の水, Jikū no Mizu; 1989)
- The Ghost in Science (サイエンスの幽霊, Saiensu no Yūrei; 1990)
- Virtual Rabbit (1991)
- Aurora (1994)
- Sim City (1995)
- Siren (1996)
- Technique of Relief (救済の技法, Kyūsai no Gihō; 1998)
- Philosopher's Propeller (賢者のプロペラ, Kenja no Puropera; 2000)
- Blue Limbo (2003)
- ICE-9 (2005)
- White Tiger Field (白虎野, Byakkoya; 2006)
- Planet Roll Call (点呼する惑星, Tenko Suru Wakusei; 2009)
- The Secret of The Flowers of Phenomenon (現象の花の秘密, Genshō no Hana no Himitsu; 2012)
- The Man Climbing the Hologram (ホログラムを登る男, Horoguramu o Noboru Otoko; 2015)
- Beacon (2021)
- The Book of Phytoelectron | 植物電子の本 | Shokubutsu denshi no hon (2024)

==== As Kaku P-Model ====
- Vistoron (2004)
- Gipnoza (гипноза, 2013)
- Kai=Kai (回 = 回, Kai ikōru Kai; 2018)
- unZIP (2025)

=== Soundtracks ===
- New Japan Pro-Wrestling Super Fighter's Themes (新日本プロレス・スーパー・ファイターのテーマ, Shin Nihon Puroresu Sūpā Faitā no Tēma; wrestling matches, 1980)
- X-Bomber (エックス ボンバー, Ekkusu Bonbā; anime, 1980)
- Model House Works (assorted adverts, 1985)
- Detonator Orgun (anime, 1991–1992)
- Glory Wars (light novels, 1993)
- Sword-Wind Chronicle Berserk (剣風伝奇ベルセルク, Kenpū Denki Beruseruku; anime, 1997)
- Lost Legend (theme park stage show, 1999)
- Sword of the Berserk: Guts' Rage (ベルセルク 千年帝国の鷹篇 喪失花の章, Beruseruku Sennen Teikoku No Taka Hen Wasurebana no Shō; Berserk: Millennium Falcon Arc - Chapter of the Flowers of Oblivion, video game, 1999)
- Millennium Actress (千年女優, Sennen Joyū; anime, 2002)
- AmigaOS 4 (operating system, 2004)
- Paranoia Agent (妄想代理人, Mōsō Dairinin; anime, 2004)
- Berserk: Millennium Falcon Arc - Chapter of the Holy Demon War (ベルセルク 千年帝国の鷹篇 聖魔戦記の章, Beruseruku Sennen Teikoku No Taka Hen Seima Senki no Shō; video game, 2004)
- Paprika (パプリカ, Papurika; anime, 2006)
- Dreaming Machine (夢みる機械, Yume Miru Kikai; anime)
- Berserk: The Golden Age Arc (ベルセルク 黄金時代篇, Beruseruku Ōgon Jidai-hen; anime, 2012–2013)
- Berserk (ベルセルク, Beruseruku; anime, 2016–2017)
- Opus (anime)
- Ruiner (video game)

== Publications ==
- Landsale – Record Copy Full Score (with Yasumi Tanaka & Katsuhiko Akiyama). Ongaku Shunjū, 1980
- P-Model. I3 Promotion, 1992
- ura P-mania (裏P－MANIA) – P-model no kako ha ikaga?. Sankakuyama Tsūshin (independent fan club), 1995 (collection of press clippings & flyers, 1973–1993)
- Music Industrial Wastes (音楽産業廃棄物, Ongaku Sangyō Haikibutsu) (by Kasiko Takahasi). Chaos Union & SoftBank Publishing, 1999 (2 volumes & 1 CD-ROM)
  - P-Model Side – Open Source
  - Hirasawa Side – Desktop Ouroboros (卓上のウロボロス, Takujō no Uroborosu)
  - Rev.2.0 (revised & expanded reissue). Fascination & Book-ing, 2005
  - Rev.2.4 v2010 (revised & expanded digital reissue). Chaos Union & Fascination, 2010 (available as both a limited pressing of 1000 physical DVD-ROMs and as download)
- SP-2 (タイのニューハーフ？ いいえ「第2の女性」です). Chaos Union & Teslakite, 2008 (mix of photography & essays)
- Near Future Never Come (来なかった近未来). Chaos Union & Fascination (material originally posted on FAMIGA from December 1998 to March 2002), 2012

Newsletters

- Moire Club. Model House, 1985–1989 (12 volumes)
- Hirasawa Bypass. I3 Promotion, 1989–1996 (19 volumes)
- Green Nerve. Chaos Union & Teslakite, 1997–present (37 volumes)

Special releases

- Another Papers. Model House & Personal Pulse, 1983
- Bookmark's Banquet (宴の栞, Utage no Shiori) two 16-page booklets: Kami (上; Upper) & Shimo (下; Lower). DIW (Disk Union) & SYUN, 1994
- tokyo paranesian. I3 Promotion, 1994
- Sim City Photographs. I3 Promotion, 1995
- Interactive Live Show Vol.5. Hirasawa Bypass (I3 Promotion), 1996
- p-model 1996. Hirasawa Bypass (I3 Promotion), 1996
- Day Scanner of Susumu Hirasawa. Chaos Union & Teslakite, 1997
- deranged door (錯乱の扉, sakuran no tobira). Chaos Union & Marquee, 1997 (2 volumes)
- World Cell – History of Interactive Live Show. Chaos Union & Teslakite, 1998
- A Young Person's Guide to Mandrake 1973–1978. Chaos Union & Mecano, 2006
- Live Byakkoya. Chaos Union & Teslakite, 2006

== See also ==
- List of ambient music artists
