= Berserk: Millennium Falcon Hen Seima Senki no Shō =

Berserk Millennium Empire Arc: Chapter of the Holy Demon War
- Developer: Yuke's
- Publisher: Sammy Corporation
- Director: Masamichi Ito
- Producers: Ryūichi Harada; Norifumi Hara
- Designers: Yasushi Funakoshi; Tetsuya Seta; Kota Toyoda; Osamu Hashimoto; Kentaro Arai
- Programmer: Katsumi Nakagaki
- Writer: Katsuhiko Tokunaga
- Composer: Susumu Hirasawa
- Series: Berserk
- Platform: PlayStation 2
- Release: JP: 7 October 2004
- Genre: Action-adventure
- Mode: Single-player

Berserk Millennium Falcon Arc: Chapter of the Holy Demon War (ベルセルク 千年帝国の鷹篇 聖魔戦記の章, Beruseruku Millenium Falcon Hen Seima Senki no Shō) is an action video game that was released by Sega-Sammy in Japan for the PlayStation 2. It is the second video game based on the manga Berserk.

Sammy licensed the game to YBM-Sisa for a Korean version, which was released at the same time.

Its predecessor, Sword of the Berserk: Guts' Rage, was released on Dreamcast by ASCII in 1999. Both Berserk video games were created by the Japanese developer Yuke's.

== Gameplay ==
The game's story covers part of the Millennium Empire Arc from the manga volumes 22 to 27. With its more detailed polygonal models, it is visually more sophisticated than its five years' predecessor on Sega Dreamcast. The maps are much larger than in the first game. A motion capture process was used for added realism in character moves. Voice dubbing was made with the original anime television series cast.

== Story ==
The story is an adaption of the manga Berserk, and it adapts the storyline from volumes 22 to 27. Guts is on a quest to restore Casca to sanity by traveling to Elfheim. There is also an original subplot involving an Apostle named Charles who haunts Guts with memories of the former members of The Band of the Hawk.

== Soundtrack ==
The Berserk Millennium Empire Arc: Chapter of the Holy Demon War original soundtrack (ベルセルク 千年帝国の鷹篇 聖魔戦記の章~ Original Game Soundtrack) was released on 25 November 2004 in Japan by Vap and ULF Records. Susumu Hirasawa, who did the music for the anime and the DC game, composed Sign as the opening theme (as well as Sign-2, an alternate version of Sign that was used as the game's end theme); both tracks were released by Hirasawa's Chaos Union company in downloadable format through Hirasawa's WORLD CELL MP3 ONLINE SHOP for 4 US Dollars on 20 December 2004. Hirasawa's songs were re-released as part of the HALDYN DOME box set, they were put on CD 10, with the Berserk anime soundtrack and the Sword of the Berserk: Guts' Rage soundtrack. The rest of the game's soundtrack was created by Sound Ams composers Shinya Chikamori, Hiroshi Watanabe, Yasushi Hasegawa, and Tomoyo Nishimoto.

== Release ==
The game was released in Japan on October 7, 2004. Two different releases were made in Japan, a collector Branded Box Limited Edition special package including a Guts action figure created by the famous Japanese manufacturer Art of War and the cheaper Standard Edition. In Republic of Korea, the Korean subtitled standard edition was bundled with the action figure in small quantities, only offered to pre-ordering customers. The Korean and Japanese versions were both released the same day. The soundtrack to the game was also sold separately.

== Reception ==
Famitsu magazine gave it a score of 28 out of 40.
