= Aurora (Susumu Hirasawa album) =

Studio album by Susumu Hirasawa
- Released: February 25, 1994
- Recorded: 1993
- Studios: Eggs Shep Studio, Oshino, Minamitsuru, Yamanashi; Key-Stone Studio, Sendagaya, Shibuya, Tokyo; Wireself Studio, Yoyogi, Shibuya, Tokyo; Onkio Haus (mast.), Ginza, Chūō, Tokyo
- Genres: Art pop; electronica
- Length: 60:11
- Label: Polydor K.K.
- Producer: Susumu Hirasawa

Susumu Hirasawa chronology
Virtual Rabbit (1991)	Aurora (1994)	Sim City (1995)

Aurora is the fourth studio album by Susumu Hirasawa, released on February 25, 1994, via Polydor K.K. It is his first album in three years, and is considered to be a starting point in Hirasawa's rise in stardom in Japan and internationally.

== Overview ==
His first main solo album in three years following a period where focus was directed on the Defrosted P-Model, Aurora, which Hirasawa has said can be considered a second solo debut, is a turning point in his career. Unlike the previous solo albums, Aurora doesn't feature guest musicians, with almost all instrumentation handled by MIDI-compatible devices. The music was composed with the Amiga The Blue Ribbon SoundWorks programs Bars & Pipes Professional, which he started using for "more natural orchestration", and SuperJAM!, whose "Bartok" style he modified by inputting data from his own songs, irreversibly turning its patterns and variations into "Hirasawa" style ones.

Aurora was created to appeal to the instinctual side of the listener as opposed to the logical, in likeness to tales and myths, emphasizing vocals and melody. The songs were written so that the album would lack any inherent story or concept, inviting the listener to create their own reading. However, as he wrote the lyrics out, seven of the album's ten songs ended up having to do with "you" (キミ, kimi), which accidentally created undertones of a story about two people. Hirasawa wanted to avoid that if at all possible, but felt that was just the way the language worked and left it as is. Many words representing natural phenomena were included in an attempt to resolve complaints about the lyrics being opaque. Hirasawa chose words that were easy to understand and had a large impact, the word Aurora came from this decision as well.

The album's booklet is adorned with Buddhist imagery. Advertisements for Aurora used the phrase "The Greatest Music of All" (至高の音楽, Shikou no Ongaku).

== Track listing ==
All tracks are written by Susumu Hirasawa.

No.	Title	Length
1.	"Stone Garden" (石の庭 Ishi no Niwa)	6:02
2.	"Love Song"	7:02
3.	"Aurora" (オーロラ Ōrora)	4:17
4.	"Song of the Force" (力の唄 Chikara no Uta)	5:28
5.	"Take the Wheel" (舵をとれ Kaji wo Tore)	4:32
6.	"Snow Blind" (スノーブラインド Sunōburaindo)	6:40
7.	"The Double of Wind" (風の分身 Kaze no Bunshin)	4:51
8.	"In the Square" (広場で Hiroba de)	4:34
9.	"Island Door (Paranesian Circle)" (トビラ島 (パラネシアン・サークル) Tobira Shima (Paraneshian Sākuru))	13:29
10.	"Ringing Bell" (呼んでるベル Yonderu Beru)	2:57

- The official translations of the titles of the songs are stylized in all uppercase letters.
- "Snow Blind" contains a sample of "Oh Mama!" by P-Model, from the album One Pattern.

== Personnel ==
- Susumu Hirasawa - vocals, electric guitar (Talbo), acoustic guitar (Yairi), synthesizers (E-mu Proteus/2, Korg MS-20, Korg M1R, Roland JD-800), sampler (Akai S1100), drum machine (Roland R-8 with DANCE card), Amiga (2500), sequencer (Bars&Pipes Professional), programming, production

technical

- Masanori Chinzei - recording, mixing
- Motohiro Yamada (Eggs Shep Studio), Harumi Ōta (MIX), Tsutomu Okada (MIX) - assistant engineering
- Masao Nakazato (Onkio Haus) - mastering

visuals

- Kiyoshi Inagaki (d.d.t.) - art direction, design
- Hideki Namai - photography
- Akemi Tsujitani - styling
- Kazunori Yoshida - hair & make-up

operations

- Roppei Iwagami (Pre-Octave) - publishing
- I_{3} Promotion
  - Yūichi Kenjo - co-production
  - Masami Fujii - publicity coordination
  - Koosuke Mogi - artist management
  - Takeshi Fujita - personal management
- Polydor K.K.
  - Osamu Takeuchi - direction
  - Tomohide Ishikawa - A&R chief
  - Hitoshi Maeda - executive production

Thanks

- Gallery LS for Mandala (スーナムギャムフォ), Fernandes

== Release history ==
Date	Label(s)	Format	Catalog	Notes
February 25, 1994	Polydor K.K.	CD	POCH-1328	
July 1, 2005	Universal Music Japan, Universal Sigma	Digital Download	none	
February 29, 2012	Chaos Union, Teslakite	CD	CHTE-0057	Remastered by Masanori Chinzei. Disc 4 of the HALDYN DOME box set.
November 5, 2014	Universal Music Japan	SHM-CD	UPCY-6930	Part of Universal's "Project Archetype" (supervised by Osamu Takeuchi & Kasiko Takahasi). Remastered by Kenji Yoshino (supervised by Chinzei) with both original liner notes and new ones.

- "Love Song", "Aurora", "Song of the Force" and "Snow Blind" are included in the NEW SONGS FROM AURORA promotional sampler.
- "Love Song", "Aurora" and "In the Square" are included on the Archetype | 1989-1995 Polydor years of Hirasawa compilation.
- "Island Door (Paranesian Circle)" is included in the vinyl release of the Ruiner Original Soundtrack.
