= Byakkoya – White Tiger Field =

White Tiger Field

Studio album by Susumu Hirasawa
- Released: February 2, 2006
- Studio: Studio WIRESELF 2002 Solar Version
- Genre: Art pop; choral; new-age; synthpop
- Length: 52:46
- Label: Chaos Union, TESLAKITE CHTE-0034
- Producer: Susumu Hirasawa

Susumu Hirasawa chronology
Blue Limbo (2003)	White Tiger Field (2006)	Planet Roll Call (2009)

White Tiger Field (白虎野, Byakkoya) is the tenth studio album by Susumu Hirasawa, released on February 2, 2006. The album's name is taken from the Bạch Hổ or White Tiger oil field in Vietnam.

Two of its songs were featured in the 2006 anime film Paprika.

== Track listing ==
All tracks are written by Susumu Hirasawa.

No.	Title	Length
1.	"The Westward of Time" (時間の西方 Jikan no Seihō)	6:10
2.	"White Tiger Field" (白虎野 "Byakkoya")	4:47
3.	"The Stillborn City" (生まれなかった都市 Umarenakatta Toshi)	6:39
4.	"The Man from Memories" (記憶から来た男 Kioku Kara Kita Otoko)	5:00
5.	"Water Vein" (水脈 Sui Myaku)	5:48
6.	"Code: Costa Rica"	3:41
7.	"Fern of the Planet Sigma" (Σ星のシダ Shiguma Hoshi no Shida)	5:21
8.	"Probability Hill" (確率の丘 Kakuritsu no Oka)	4:42
9.	"White Tiger" (白虎 Byakko)	4:57
10.	"Parade" (パレード Parēdo)	5:45

- "Parade" contains samples of "Nurse Cafe" (by Susumu Hirasawa, from the album Siren) and "Monster a Go Go" (by P-Model, from the box set Ashu-on [Sound Subspecies] in the solar system).

== Personnel ==
- Susumu Hirasawa – Vocals, Electric guitar (TALBO Secret FACTORY ICE-9), Electronic keyboard (Roland A-37), Amiga, Personal computer, Digital audio workstation (Cakewalk Sonar), Synthesizers (EASTWEST Symphonic Orchestra, EASTWEST Symphonic Choirs), Vocaloid (Leon, Lola, Miriam, Meiko), Sampler (NATIVE INSTRUNENTS Kontakt), Sequencer (Bars'n'Pipes), Programming, Production
- Nguyen Ngoc Hoa (BOUGAIN VILLAEA) – Voice on "Byakkoya – White Tiger Field"
- Masanori Chinzei – Recording, Mixing, Mastering
- Syotaro Takami – Translation
- Toshifumi "non graph" Nakai – Design
- Presented by CHAOS UNION/TESLAKITE LABEL: Kenji Sato, Rihito Yumoto and Mika Hirano
