= The Secret of the Flowers of Phenomenon =

Studio album by Susumu Hirasawa
- Released: November 23, 2012
- Studio: Studio WIRESELF
- Genre: Art pop; classical crossover; dark wave
- Length: 52:13
- Label: Chaos Union, TESLAKITE CHTE-0071
- Producer: Susumu Hirasawa

Susumu Hirasawa chronology
Planet Roll Call (2009)	The Secret of the Flowers of Phenomenon (2012)	The Man Climbing the Hologram (2015)

The Secret of the Flowers of Phenomenon (現象の花の秘密, Genshō no Hana no Himitsu) is the twelfth solo album by Susumu Hirasawa.

Setting itself apart from previous albums, electronic sounds are toned down significantly in favor of strings and other classical instruments.

== Track listing ==
All tracks are written by Susumu Hirasawa.

No.	Title	Length
1.	"The Secret of the Flowers of Phenomenon" (現象の花の秘密 Genshō no Hana no Himitsu)	4:19
2.	"Ghost Ship" (幽霊船 Yūrei Sen)	3:33
3.	"The Shadow of Bloom" (華の影 Hana no Kage)	4:49
4.	"Brain-Centric Theory" (脳動説 Nō-Dō Setsu)	4:02
5.	"Zalinero The Thief" (盗人ザリネロ Nusutto Zarinero)	5:23
6.	"The Visitor" (侵入者 Shinnyūshya)	4:47
7.	"Astro-Ho! Phase-7"	3:49
8.	"Amputee Gerbera" (Amputeeガーベラ Amputee Gābera)	4:18
9.	"Horde of Thistledown" (冠毛種子の大群 Kanmō Shushi no Taigun)	4:35
10.	"Circular G" (空転G Kūten G)	4:07
11.	"The Secret of the Flowers of Phenomenon-E" (現象の花の秘密-E Genshō no Hana no Himitsu-E) (bonus track)	4:16
12.	"Amputee Gerbera-E" (Amputeeガーベラ-E Amputee Gābera-E) (bonus track)	4:18

== Personnel ==
- Susumu Hirasawa – Vocals, Guitars, Keyboards, Personal computer, Digital audio workstation, Synthesizers, Sampler, Sequencer, Programming, Production
- Masanori Chinzei – Recording, Mixing, Mastering
- Syotaro Takami and S.L. Surovec – Translation
- non-graph (Toshifumi Nakai) – Design
- Presented by Chaos Union: Kenji sato, Rihito Yumoto, Mika Hirano, Kinuko Mochizuki and Misato Oguro
