= Desk Top Hard Lock =

Studio album by Kotobuki Hikaru with Phnonpenh Model
- Released: July 25, 1994; January 15, 2011 (Reissue)
- Recorded: 27 June 1992 ("Industrial Music"); 12 October – 30 November 1993
- Studios: Kotobuki LAB ("Industrial Music"); STUDIO WIRE SELF
- Genres: Avant-garde; Electronic; Experimental; Techno; Technopop; World
- Length: 34:19
- Labels: DIW Records, SYUN; IRQ inc. (Reissue)
- Producers: Hikaru Kotobuki; DIW & Masami Fujii (Co-Producers)

Hikaru Kotobuki chronology
Desk Top Hard Lock (1994)	mosaic via post (2002)

Phnonpenh MODEL chronology
Errors of P-MANIA! (1993)	Desk Top Hard Lock (1994)	PATCHWORKS (1998)

Desk Top Hard Lock is the first studio album by Phnonpenh Model and the first solo album by Hikaru Kotobuki.

The band was formed to participate in the Errors of P-MANIA! copy band contest, where they performed the song "Be in a Fix" (from the album Perspective) while sampling "Immigrant Song", among the other members there was the cross-dressing Lion Merry (formerly of Yapoos, Metrofarce, Virgin VS) and Shonen Maruta (formerly of Ikiru), both members of the band echo-U-nite.

It mixes the electronic sounds used by Kotobuki on the "Defrosted" era of P-Model with ethnic sounds inspired by his travels through the world and the overall mood is marked by Kotobukii's peculiar sense of humor; it also features some sound alteration that Kotobuki would explore in later releases.

After this album was released, Kotobuki sold all his musical instruments and travelled through Asia, which left Phnonpenh MODEL inactive until 1997.

== Track listing ==
All songs arranged by Hikaru Kotobuki and Lion Merry.

No.	Title	Lyrics	Music	Length
1.	"Industrial Music" (産業音楽 Sangyō Ongaku)	instrumental	Kotobuki	1:19
2.	"Life, Death, And I" (生と死と私と Sei to Shi to Watashi to)	Masaaki "Shonen Maruta" Taniguchi	Kotobuki, Merry	4:44
3.	"Neoteny BOX" (幼形成熟BOX Yō Keisei Juku BOX)	Susumu Hirasawa, Kotobuki	Hirasawa, Kotobuki	4:09
4.	"D.T.H.L"	Maruta	Kotobuki, Merry, Maruta, Thaniya Patpong, Yasuchika Fujii	2:38
5.	"Thousand-Year Naga" (千年ナーガ Chitose Nāga)	Maruta	Merry	3:55
6.	"Skyburial ～ A.JET69" (鳥葬 ～ A.JET69 Torisō ～ A.JET69)	Maruta	Maruta	4:46
7.	"Hachiman to SPIRAL" (八幡 to SPIRAL)	instrumental	Kotobuki	2:24
8.	"LuLuLu-Man" (ルルル男 RuRuRu-Otoko)	Hirasawa, Kotobuki	Hirasawa, Kotobuki	1:08
9.	"Apollo-Vietnam" (アポロベトナム Aporo-Betonamu)	Maruta	Merry	3:21
10.	"Timebomb-Chime" (時限時報 Jigen-Jihō)	instrumental	Kotobuki	5:57

Track 3 is a rerecording/remix of the P-Model song of the same name from Big Body, track 8 is a partial a capella rendition of "Lab=01" from the album P-Model, track 10 is a remix of "Opening SE 1992", P-Model's 'walk on' show opening music.

== Personnel ==
- Hikaru Kotobuki – Keyboard, Vocal, Victory 3000, Production
- Lion Merry – Keyboard, Vocal, Kalimba
- Masaaki "Shonen Maruta" Taniguchi – Vocal, Overtone, Tibetan Bell
- Thaniya Patpong – Guitar, Vocal, Mandolin
- Masami Fujii, DIW – Co-Production
- Takeshi Fujita – Direction
- Motohiro Yamada – Mixing
- Kiyoshi Inagaki – Art director
- Nakagawa-san – Photography
- Susumu Hirasawa – Liner notes
