= One Pattern =

Studio album by P-Model
- Released: June 25, 1986
- Recorded: 1986
- Studio: Various: Alfa Studio A, Shibaura, Minato, Tokyo; LDK Studio, Otowa, Bunkyō, Tokyo; Music Inn Yamanakako, Yamanakako, Minamitsuru, Yamanashi
- Genre: Progressive rock; electronic rock
- Length: 39:27
- Label: Alfa, Edge
- Producer: Akiro "Kamio" Arishima

P-Model chronology
Karkador (1985)	One Pattern (1986)	P-Model (1992)

Singles from One Pattern
- 1. "Another Day c/w Zebra" Released: May 1986 (promo) ALFA-134

One Pattern (stylized as ONE PATTERN) is a 1986 album by P-Model and the last before the band's hiatus in 1988.

== Background ==
After the end of the supporting tour for Karkador, P-Model was left without a bassist and a keyboardist. Frontman Susumu Hirasawa recruited Teruo Nakano and Yoshikazu Takahashi to fill the roles respectively, taking P-Model's sound in a new direction.

One Pattern's style follows closely after Hirasawa's work in Karkador, with Nakano as the main creative partner. Together, they employed varied musical styles, from orchestral to classic guitar work, while producing in a way as to create a lo-fi sound.

== Production ==
Due to the rising prominence of digital technology at the time, artificial sounds were used on the album more so than ever before. The songs were recorded with a Casio CZ-5000's built-in 8 track sequencer, as the band could not afford a standalone. For reproducing the sound for live performances they relied on intuition and using the devices they had on hand.

Hirasawa implemented a MIDI guitar on some songs, sometimes purposefully playing it "the wrong way" aiming to surprise the listener, though he struggled with the unreliability of the gear and its constant sound output delay. The complex basslines were played by Nakano on either a bass or on a keyboard. Takahashi took to heavy usage of samplers and using a cassette deck to play pre-recorded choral accompaniments, as well as having a hand in engineering. Drummer Yasuhiro Araki meanwhile, had his role in the band greatly diminished, with most of the drumming on the album handled by sequencers.

One Pattern was recorded under a strenuous schedule by a P-Model in low spirits, with Hirasawa having his vision heavily imposed on by various circumstances, and he has since called this his least favorite P-Model album. This was reflected in the album's title, "one pattern" being a Japanese phrase for "stuck in a rut".

== Track listing ==
All tracks are written by Susumu Hirasawa, except where noted.

No.	Title	Writer(s)	Length
1.	"OH MAMA!"		3:56
2.	"LICORICE LEAF"	Teruo Nakano	4:04
3.	"Astro Notes"		3:31
4.	"Möbius band" (メビウスの帯 Mebiusu no obi)	Nakano	2:13
5.	"Drums"		5:53
6.	"Zebra"		4:23
7.	"Oyasumi Dog" (おやすみDOG)		3:13
8.	"Another Day"		3:08
9.	"Harmonium" (ハーモニウム Hāmoniumu)		5:28
10.	"Sunpaleets" (サンパリーツ Sanparītsu)	Nakano	3:39

== Personnel ==
P-Model – Arrangements, Backing vocals on "Drums"

- Susumu Hirasawa – Vocal, Keyboards, Guitar
- Yasuhiro Araki – Drums, Gong Bass, Percussion
- Teruo Nakano – Bass, Keyboards, Lead vocals on "LICORICE LEAF" and "Möbius band", Backing vocals
- Yoshikazu Takahashi – Systems (Keyboards, Sampler, Cassette deck, Backing vocals, Engineering)

Guest musicians & production

- Kayo "Kokubo" Matsumoto – "MAMA" Vocal on "OH MAMA!"
- Suginami Junior Chorus (credited as "Suginami Jido Gassho-Dan") – "Sunpaleets" Voice
- Masami Orimo (listed under special thanks) – Backing vocals on "Drums"
- Akiro "Kamio" Arishima (AC Unit) – Keyboards on "Another Day", Production
- Akitsugu Doi (Alfa Records) – Mixing, Engineering
- Katsunori Takashima (Alfa Records) and Nobuo Namie (Freedom Studio) – Assistant Engineering
- Mitsuharu Kobayashi (CBS-Sony) – Mastering Engineer

Staff

- Toshikazu Awano (Alfa Records) – A&R Coordination
- Mitsuru Hirose (Model House) – Artist Management
- Yūichi Hirasawa – Art director
- Tatsuo Kuda – Photography
- Akemi Tsujitani (AC Unit) – Costumer
- Special Thanks: Yoshiaki Kondo (Gok Sound), Akai, Talbo (Tōkai Gakki), Taro Yamamoto, Imagica

== Release history ==
Date	Label(s)	Format	Catalog	Notes
June 25, 1986	Alfa Records, Edge Records	LP	ELR-28004	
July 25, 1986	Alfa Records, Edge Records	CD	32XA-79	First native CD release of a P-Model album.
February 21, 1992	Alfa Records, Edge Records	CD	ALCA-259	Released (alongside Karkador) five days before the release of P-Model.
December 21, 1994	Alfa Music, Edge Records	CD	ALCA-9135	Released (alongside Karkador) 20 days after the debut show of the "Revised" P-Model.
May 10, 2002; July 4, 2014	Chaos Union, Teslakite	CD	CHTE-0010	Remastered by Hirasawa. Part of Disc 6 of the Ashu-on [Sound Subspecies] in the solar system box set, alongside demos and bootlegs of songs originally meant for inclusion on Monster and a different arrangement of Kameari Pop (from In a Model Room) made for a "One Pattern Band" show (with Kera and former members). Re-released with new packaging by Kiyoshi Inagaki.
July 25, 2007; April 12, 2012	Sony Music Direct, GT Music	CD	MHCL-1137	Remastered, limited release (alongside Karkador). Packaged in a paper sleeve to replicate the original LP packaging. Re-pressing (without sticker to indicate packaging) sold only through Tower Records.

- "Another Day" is included on the TWINS SOUND SAMPLER Vol.2～ROCK/POPS COLLECTION various artists compilation.
- "OH MAMA!" is included on the TWINS SOUND SAMPLER Vol.4～TECHNO POP COLLECTION various artists compilation.

== See also ==
- 1986 in Japanese music
