= Karkador =

Studio album by P-Model
- Released: October 25, 1985
- Recorded: Tokyo, 1985
- Studios: Various: LDK Studio, Otowa, Bunkyō; Gok Sound Studio, Kichijōji, Musashino; Studio Somewhere, Gohongi, Meguro; Toei Tokyo Satsueijo, Higashiōizumi, Nerima; Alfa Studio A, Shibaura, Minato
- Genres: Progressive rock; electronic rock
- Length: 36:38
- Labels: Alfa, Edge
- Producer: Akiro "Kamio" Arishima

P-Model chronology
Scuba (1984)	Karkador (1985)	One Pattern (1986)

Karkador is the sixth album by the Japanese electronic rock band P-Model, and the first where frontman Susumu Hirasawa was the sole remaining founding member.

== Background and composition ==
Karkador was mainly inspired by the dreams of P-Model's vocalist Susumu Hirasawa. He had been seeing a Jungian counselor, as he was in a troubled mental state at the time. The counselor suggested that he record his dreams in a notebook to aid his recovery. He developed a narrative and lyrics for the album based on those notes.

Sadatoshi Tainaka, the band's original drummer, decided to leave after the previous tour's conclusion. He was replaced by Yasuhiro Araki, a huge fan of P-Model who had formerly played in a punk rock band. The band got signed to Alfa Records's sub-label for underground acts Edge, which allowed them to use Alfa's studios and mixing equipment, which was far better than what they had access to during their independent period.

== Recording and production ==
In addition to Hirasawa's journal, P-Model used songwriting contributions from their keyboardist Shunichi Miura and bassist Tadahiko Yokogawa. Hirasawa and Yokogawa had equal creative control over the band, though Yokogawa has said that his influence on the album was somewhat nuanced. Although the album has a new wave style much like 1984's Scuba, it also includes a wider array of sounds; mixing live drumming with programmed drumming, march-styled rhythms, and classical instruments. The band tried to keep the album raw, with Yokogawa hoping add some raw explosive power to the material, resulting in a brighter, more upbeat sound than recent efforts.

Hirasawa had many ideas in regards to the sound of the album, but faced issues with engineering. He wanted Karkador to sound "underground", feeling that in-house engineer at Gok Studio Yoshiaki Kondo was best for the job. Kondo worked on some recordings, making the drums purposefully messy, but his work was altered by an Alfa in house mixing engineer—who only worked on the album due to company policy—without Hirasawa's consent. Miura had doubts as to the direction that P-Model was taking and left the band alongside Yokogawa, who felt that touring in support of the album was too rigorous. Miura joined the band Uchōten shortly after, which might’ve contributed to Hirasawa and Uchōten’s vocalist Kera’s good friendship. Due to their departure, half of the album was never performed live after from 1986 onwards.

== Track listing ==
All tracks are written by Susumu Hirasawa, except where noted.

No.	Title	Lyrics	Music	Length
1.	"Karkador"			2:58
2.	"On the Organ-Yama" (オルガン山にて Orugan-Yama ni Te)			3:13
3.	"Dance Subomp" (ダンス素凡夫(スボンプ) Dansu Subonpu)	Hirasawa, Shunichi Miura	Miura, Tadahiko Yokogawa	4:19
4.	"Cyborg" (サイボーグ Saibōgu)			3:33
5.	"1778–1985"			4:14
6.	"Leak"			4:19
7.	"Oar" (オール Ōru)	Yokogawa	Yokogawa	4:05
8.	"Hourglass"		Hirasawa, Yokogawa	3:17
9.	"Piper"		Yokogawa	5:53
10.	"Karçador"			0:48

== Personnel ==
P-Model – Arrangements

- Susumu Hirasawa – Vocals, Guitar
- Shunichi Miura – Keyboards, Backing vocals
- Tadahiko Yokogawa – Bass, Lead vocals on "Oar", Backing vocals, Electric violin, Ocarinas (bass, tenor and soprano), MSX, Keyboards, Sampler
- Yasuhiro Araki – Drums, Electronic drums, Percussion

Staff

- Akiro "Kamio" Arishima (AC Unit) – Production
- Toshikazu Awano (Alfa Records) – A&R Coordination
- Mitsuru Hirose (Model House) – Artist Management
- Mitsuo Koike (Alfa Records) – Mixing, Engineering
- Yoshiaki Kondo (Gok Sound) and Akitsugu Doi (Alfa Records) – Additional Engineering
- Hideaki Nojima (Alfa Records) and Kazuaki Nagai (Somewhere) – Assistant Engineering
- Hiroaki Sugawara (Gok Sound) – Digital Equipment Operation
- Teppei Kasai (CBS-Sony) – Mastering engineer
- Yuichi Hirasawa – Art Direction & Obje
- Kayo Muto – Art Drawing
- Hideki Namai – Photography
- Hideki Higashi (Touch-Up) – Hair & Makeup
- Akemi Tsujitani (AC Unit) – Costuming
- Ginza Matsuzakaya, Ginza Miyuki-Dori Jun, Hiromichi Nakano, Viva You – Clothes
- Toshinao Tsukui (Alfa Records) – Cover Coordination
- Special Thanks to: Talbo (Tōkai Gakki) (for Hirasawa), Take Off Studio (for rehearsal), Akemi Arai (Toei), Yoshito Imai (Media Bum), Teruo Nakano, Taro Yamamoto, Yuji Matsuda, Hisaaki Kato, Takashi Kokubo, Osamu Ishii, Miyuki & Miwa Kumagaya, Kuni, Shuji Furu, Akira, Ryuta Staff Room HB, Ted Osawa, Akira Sakurai

== Release history ==
Date	Label(s)	Format	Catalog	Notes
October 25, 1985	Alfa Records, Edge Records	LP	ELR-28002	
February 21, 1992	Alfa Records, Edge Records	CD	ALCA-258	Released (alongside One Pattern) five days before the release of P-Model.
December 21, 1994	Alfa Music, Edge Records	CD	ALCA-9134	Released 20 days after the debut show of the "Revised" P-Model.
May 10, 2002; July 4, 2014	Chaos Union, Teslakite	CD	CHTE-0009	Remastered by Hirasawa. Part of Disc 5 of the Ashu-on [Sound Subspecies] in the solar system box set, alongside phonosheet-only releases from 1983 & 1985, some of them by the members that played on this album. "Birds" is on the fan club exclusive Disc 0 (CHTE-0021). Re-released with new packaging by Kiyoshi Inagaki.
July 25, 2007; April 12, 2012	Sony Music Direct, GT Music	CD	MHCL-1136	Remastered, limited release. Packaged in a paper sleeve to replicate the original LP packaging. Re-pressing (without sticker to indicate packaging) sold only through Tower Records.

- "Leak" is included on the TWINS SOUND SAMPLER Vol.4～TECHNO POP COLLECTION various artists compilation.

== See also ==
- 1985 in Japanese music
