= Another Game =

Studio album by P-Model
- Released: February 25, 1984
- Recorded: 1983
- Studio: Sound Sky Studio, Nakano, Nakano, Tokyo
- Genre: Post-punk; industrial rock; no wave
- Length: 44:20
- Label: Tokuma, Japan
- Producer: P-Model

P-Model chronology
Perspective (1982)	Another Game (1984)	Scuba (1984)

Another Game is the fifth studio album by P-Model.

== Background ==
In March 1983, Yasumi Tanaka, P-Model's original keyboardist, left the group and the music industry entirely due to a severe case of writer's block. His departure left the band in a state of crisis, as leader Susumu Hirasawa was for the first time the only major creative force since the group's days as Mandrake.

== Composition ==
With Hirasawa assuming full creative control of the band, Another Game's songs reflected the signature mood that would be prevalent throughout his career. The album carries over the sensory experimentation of Perspective and their 1983 self-released album Fu Kyoka Kyoku Shū. Hirasawa uses atypical song structures, as well as those to affect the listener through biofeedback and alpha waves. Guitar and atmospheric synths are emphasized as opposed to the loud bass and drums of Perspective. The album also pays homage to Pink Floyd, whom Hirasawa drew deep inspiration from for his music.

Hirasawa described the concept underpinning the album thus:

"There is a certain logic that the world has been based on thus far, right? Even if the world changes, that logic remains unchanged. Unless that logic changes, there is nothing that has been fundamentally changed, for better or for worse. Changing the situation over and over again accomplished nothing, so in order to create the idea that this logic needs to be completely changed the name ended up being Another Game." (Note: 今まで世の中が成り立ってきた一つの筋っていうのがあるでしょう。世の中の状態がいくら変わっても、その筋っていうのは延々変わらないで、いるわけです。その筋が変わらないと本質的には何も変わったことにはならない、良く変わろうが、悪く変わろうが。状態だけをやりくりしてもラチが明かないので、全く別な筋を作るという発想を持たなくちゃいけないということで、『アナザー・ゲーム』になったんです。)

== Release ==
The album was originally scheduled to be released on 25 October 1983. However, the band's label Japan Record postponed it three times. A situation that deeply aggravated Hirasawa, to the point of going public:

"The [Recording Industry Association of Japan's Record Creation Standards and Ethics Committee (レコード制作基準倫理委員会（レコ倫）)] put in a complaint about the words 'deformed' and 'defect' in the lyrics [of "Atom-Siberia"]… that was 4 days before the release.

So I decided to use ateji when rewriting so the release could be on 25 November, but the CEO of the record company told me to 'change the lyrics for the offending parts'. That 'even if ateji gets us past the Ethics Committee, those pronunciations could still get the company in hot water'.

I said I didn't want to, but opposing the stupidity of the Ethics Committee and the record company would just wear us out. I didn't want to delay the release yet again by getting caught up on details, and it's not like those words were crucial to the lyrics, so I went ahead with re-recording the vocals.

Using the studio and cutting the vocals again would take around 2 months, so the release date became 25 January of this year.

In the meantime, P-Model had been touring 30 locations around the country since 24 October to coincide with the release of the album, and I had corrected the date to 25 January at each stop. But it got pushed again to 25 February, this time because of the company's circumstances. I was never told what these circumstances were. I didn't say anything because I didn't want another delay, and there's always been these issues since the first album.

The record company probably doesn't want this said, but I don't care. They were the ones who didn't probably give out information on why there were so many delays." (Note: "ところが歌詞の中の"奇形"と"不具"にレコ倫（レコード制作基準管理委員会）からクレームがつきまして……それが発売の4日前だったんですけど。 それじゃ歌詞をアテ字にしようということで改収、11月25日に発売ということにしたら、レコード会社の社長から「ひっかかった箇所の歌詞を書き変えて欲しい」という要請が来たんです。「アテ字にしてレコ倫は通るかもしれないけど、そういうことでナンダカンダ言われるのは結局ウチなんだから、そういう発音自体をなくさなければならない」って。 それはイヤだって言ったんですけど、レコード会社側やレコ倫の馬鹿さ加減はもう、のれんに腕押しだと、ボクたちが消粍するだけだと。細かい所にこだわってレコードの発売を遅らせたくなかったし、その言葉を使わないと意味が通じないということでもなかったからボーカルのとり直しにOKしたんです。 でスタジオをとってもう一度カッティングしてということだと2ヵ月かかるから、今半の1月25日発売ということになったんですけど。 その間P-MODELは10月24日から全国30ヵ所アルバム・リリースに合わせてツアーを組んでたんで、その先々で1月25日と訂正してたんですけど。今度は2月25日、会社の都合でまたもや延期になったってことなんです。理由は教えてもらえなくて。ま、今まで一枚目から五枚目まで、レコード会社とはモメ事の日日だったので、これ以上モメて発売遅らせるのが厭だったので、手はうちましたけどね。 レコード会社は言って欲しくないだろうけど、もういいですよ。延期のインフォメーションもしっかりなされてなかったし。やるべき事を怠たっていたんですから。")

== Track listing ==
All tracks are written by Susumu Hirasawa, except "Bike" by Syd Barrett with adapted lyrics by Hirasawa.

No.	Title	Length
1.	"Another Game step1"	3:08
2.	"Holland Element"	3:38
3.	"Atom-Siberia"	3:49
4.	"Personal Pulse"	4:24
5.	"Fu-Ru-He-He-He" (フ・ル・ヘッ・ヘッ・ヘッ)	2:41
6.	"Bike" (Pink Floyd cover)	2:19
7.	"Harm Harmonizer" (instrumental)	0:57
8.	"Mouth to Mouth"	2:52
9.	"Floor"	7:05
10.	"Goes on Ghost"	4:30
11.	"Echoes"	3:44
12.	"Awakening Sleep〜α click" (instrumental)	5:14

"Harm Harmonizer" contains a sample of "Two on a Floor" by P-Model, from the album Fu Kyoka Kyoku Shū.

The titles of the songs are officially rendered out in all caps, except for the sub-titles of the first and last songs. "Fu-Ru-He-He-He" has had its title rendered in hiragana and translated as "FuLu He He He" on various sources.

On vinyl issues, "Awakening Sleep〜α click" leads into a locked groove, so that the track would have an "endless" effect.

== Personnel ==
P-Model – Production, Arrangements

- Susumu Hirasawa – Vocals, Guitar, Synthesizer, Heavenizer
- Sadatoshi Tainaka – Drums, Real Drum programming
- Tatsuya Kikuchi – Bass, Backing vocals
- Shunichi Miura – Keyboards, Piano, Backing vocals

Guest musicians & production

- Toshinobu Kyozima – Voice on "Another Game step1"
- Manami Takada – Backing vocals on "Mouth to Mouth"
- Eiichi Tsutaki (courtesy of Floor Records) – Xylophone and Slit drum on "Floor"
- Yasushi Konishi – Engineering
- Toshiyuki Asakuno – Assistant Engineering

Staff

- Shōzō Shiba – Direction
- Yūichi Hirasawa (credited as "Yū1 Hirasawa") – Art director
- Yōko Matsubara & Jaish (GIN-BAN) – Photography
- Model House – Productive Management
- Thanks to: Akiro "Kamio" Arishima, Ako (Zelda), Takashi Kokubo (Tsutomu Yamashita & Muse), TS STUDIO, Susumu Shigaki, Taro Yamamoto, Yuichi Yamaguchi

== Release history ==
Date	Label(s)	Format	Catalog	Notes
October 25, 1983	Tokuma Japan Corporation, Japan Record	LP	28JAL-2	Released to the music press, has a "Sample – Not For Sale" sticker on the cover. The back of the obi lists dates for the Another Game Tour (which lasted for October–December 1983) and contact numbers for Model House (P-Model's management company) & Tokuma Japan, as well as info on P-Model related/then recent Japan Record releases (which ended up being the only material included on the back of the obi when the album was eventually released). Includes "Malformed Area" version of "Atom-Siberia".
February 25, 1984	Tokuma Japan Corporation, Japan Record	LP	28JAL-2	Includes "Countless Answers" version of "Atom-Siberia", whose lyrics are omitted from the liner notes. Side B of both this version and the promo vinyl ends on a locked groove.
June 25, 1989	Tokuma Japan Corporation, WAX Records	CD	27WXD-120	Released alongside Perspective. All issues from this one onwards have the "Malformed Area" version of "Atom-Siberia".
September 25, 1994	Tokuma Japan Communications, WAX Records	CD	TKCA-70480	Released alongside Perspective. Part of the "Quality Music" series of budget reissues. Packaged in a slimline case and priced at 1500 yen.
May 10, 2002; July 4, 2014	Chaos Union, Teslakite	CD	CHTE-0008	Remastered by Hirasawa. Part of Disc 4 of the Ashu-on [Sound Subspecies] in the solar system box set, alongside Fu Kyoka Kyoku Shū. The "Countless Answers" version of "Atom-Siberia" and the Rebel Street version of "Fu-Ru-He-He-He" are on Disc 15 (CHTE-0019); "Exercise for the Heavenizer 1" is on Disc 2 (CHTE-0006). Re-released with new packaging by Kiyoshi Inagaki.
April 25, 2007	Tokuma Japan Communications, sky station, SS RECORDINGS	CD	SS-903	Remastered (digitally, 24 bit). Packaged in a paper sleeve to replicate the original LP packaging. Includes new liner notes by music industry writer Dai Onojima.
July 17, 2015	Tokuma Japan Communications, WAX Records	SHM-CD	TKCA-10134	Released alongside Perspective. Remastered, limited release. Packaged in a paper sleeve to replicate the original LP packaging.

- "Atom-Siberia" ("Malformed Area" version) is included on the Impossibles! 80's JAPANESE PUNK & NEW WAVE various artists compilation.

== See also ==
- 1984 in Japanese music
