= Kyomu no Naka de no Yūgi =

Single by Malice Mizer

from the album Bara no Seidou
- Released: May 31, 2000
- Genre: Neoclassical dark wave
- Length: 14:18
- Label: Midi:Nette
- Composer: Mana
- Lyricist: Mana

Malice Mizer singles chronology
"Saikai no Chi to Bara" (1999)	"Kyomu no Naka de no Yūgi" (2000)	"Shiroi Hada ni Kurū Ai to Kanashimi no Rondo" (2000)

"Kyomu no Naka de no Yūgi" (Japanese: 虚無の中での遊戯; "Amusement in Nihilism") is the ninth single by Japanese visual kei rock band Malice Mizer, released by Midi:Nette on May 31, 2000. It reached number 22 on the Oricon Singles Chart, selling 27,830 copies. It was the second single released from the Bara no Seidou album.

== Summary ==
The single was one of the band's first releases after the departure of vocalist Gackt, before he was replaced by Klaha. Its release was accompanied by a video single "Kyomu no Naka de no Yuugi ~de L'Image~", featuring a promotional music video to the song.

== Reception ==
The single reached number 22 and charted for a total of 3 weeks on the Oricon Singles Chart, becoming the band's sixth highest-charting single. It sold 27,830 copies. "Kyomu no Naka de no Yūgi" was used as an ending theme for the Nippon Television variety show Gōgai!! Bakushō Dai Mondai.

== Track listing ==
No.	Title	Lyrics	Music	Length
1.	"Kyomu no Naka de no Yūgi" (虚無の中での遊戯)	Mana	Mana	7:39
2.	"Kyomu no Naka de no Yūgi" (instrumental)		Mana	6:39
Total length:				14:18
