= Music Industrial Wastes: P-Model or Die =

Studio album by P-Model
- Released: September 1, 1999
- Recorded: 1999
- Studio: Various: Studio Wireself, Ibaraki; Soyuz DataFact, Tokyo; Cooshin-An, Osaka
- Genre: Electronic rock; electronica; experimental rock
- Length: 36:18
- Label: Chaos Union, Teslakite, Magnet
- Producer: P-Model

P-Model chronology
Electronic Tragedy/〜ENOLA (1997)	Music Industrial Wastes: P-Model or Die (1999)

Music Industrial Wastes: P-Model or Die, stylized as Music Industrial Wastes〜P-MODEL OR DIE (音楽産業廃棄物〜P-MODEL OR DIE, Ongaku Sangyō Haikibutsu〜P-MODEL OR DIE), is the twelfth studio album by P-Model, the third by its "revised" lineup and the final one for the band overall.

== Background ==
In 1999, feeling that technology had advanced enough and frustrated at major labels' reticence to adopt it, P-Model terminated their exclusive contract with Nippon Columbia and started the Music Industrial Wastes: P-Model or Die project. Through it, the band would completely redevelop their distribution methods, starting up the online MP3 store P-Plant with the assistance of the Nikkei Business Publications magazine netn@vi as their primary commercial channel; to service those who don't have computers, the independent label Magnet Records handled CD releases, with a delay from the site sale. They would also organize multiple online events for more direct interaction with their listeners.

As 1999 was also the 20th anniversary of the band's foundation, many activities were organized to commemorate its history, among them the rerecording of songs from the first four P-Model albums in the style of their accompanying live shows as the Virtual Live series of albums and the release of a book chronicling the group's multiple aspects.

The concept of the album Music Industrial Wastes: P-Model or Die is summed up on its first track, inspired by the frustration the P-Plant webmaster was having with the difficulties of copyright in the information age, "Logic Airforce": P-Model is locked on a battle of logic with the music industry. As an extension of the concept of Fune, the long voyage started on that album ends on a post-war battlefield, where people are rebuilding a new world, where all are invited to acceptance, things that would be called escapism and madness in the real world are celebrated, and evil spirits can show their faces. However, to continue living inside the real world to some extent, people cast aside their "real names", instead living as "dust humanoids", or "DUSToids".

== Composition ==
A theme present in the album is a proper revisiting of the core P-Model concept. To explore that, Kenji Konishi used the drum spatial processing from Perspective and whole tones, giving most of his songs a "concrete garage-like" sound and some periodic sampling of snare drums. Further playing with the "retrieving industrial wastes" concept, he also recorded about 3 hours of sampling from construction sites and similar locations.

The song that most closely realizes the "replay" concept, "Heaven 2000", is a combination of two songs: "Heaven", from Perspective, and 4-D's stand-alone single "After Dinner Party". Both "Heaven" and "After Dinner Party" were part of both bands' regular repertoire in the '80s. While originally entirely unrelated, both songs can be read as complementary to each other, and that was the motivation behind the making of "Heaven 2000".

== Recording and production ==
With the advances in technology, members sent each other demos as MP3 files, which are of a higher quality than RealAudio ones, which meant that each member could do their entire workload without meeting face-to-face. Continuing that trend, P-Model experimented with "Remote Mixdown": backups of each member's hard disk recorder were sent to Hirasawa's Studio Wireself, were Masanori Chinzei engineered them, periodically sending MP3s to each member's computer. They would then communicate feedback and instructions to him through an exclusive chat system, which also featured webcam snapshots of Chinzei at work, refreshing once every 3 minutes. The whole process could be seen by the public, who had their own chat and could listen to low-rate MP3s, all happening in real time.

Because MP3 downloads were being considered as the primary method of distribution, P-Model made sure to compress the songs to about 3 to 4 MB, with 5 MB being the maximum; they also deliberately went for "festive" numbers to celebrate the new medium.

== Track listing ==
No.	Title	Writer(s)	Length
1.	"Logic Airforce" (論理空軍 Ronri Kūgun)	Susumu Hirasawa	3:20
2.	"Lauretian" (ローレシア Rōreshia)	Kenji Konishi	3:49
3.	"Recovery Ship" (回収船 Kaishū Sen)	Hirasawa	4:16
4.	"Moon Plant-II"	Hirasawa	3:55
5.	"Heaven 2000"	Konishi	3:18
6.	"Ancient Sounds"	Konishi	3:20
7.	"Rehash"	Konishi	4:37
8.	"Waste Cabaret"	Hirasawa	3:11
9.	"Mind Scape"	Konishi	4:12
10.	"DUSToid" (DUSToidよ歩行は快適か? DUSToid yo Hokō wa Kaiteki ka?, Oh DUSToid, is Your Walk Comfortable?)	Hirasawa	3:40

== Personnel ==
- Susumu Hirasawa – Vocals, Electric guitar (Fernandes PHOTON), Synthesizers (E-mu Proteus/2, Korg M1R, Roland JD-800, Roland JD-990), Sampler (Akai S1100), Drum machine (Roland R-8 with DANCE card), Amiga (4000/040), Sequencer (Bars&Pipes Professional), Programming
- Hajime Fukuma – Synthesizers (EMS Synthi A, E-mu Ultra Proteus, Korg Polysix, Korg Mono/Poly, Roland SH-1, Roland JP-8000, Roland JV-2080, Oberheim Xpander, Sequential Circuits Prophet-T8, Waldorf Microwave), Vocoder (Korg DVP-1, Roland VP-330), Sampler (Akai S1100), Drum machine (Korg Electribe R, Novation DrumStation, Roland MC-505, Sequential Circuits TOM), Macintosh (Quadra 700, Power G3/400, PowerBook2400c/G3/240), Backing vocals
- Kenji Konishi – Bass (Steinberger XL-2), Synthesizers (Korg 770, Korg PS-3200, Oberheim OB-X, Oberheim Xpander, Oberheim Matrix-12, Quasimidi Sirius, Sequential Circuits Prophet-5, Sequential Circuits Prophet-10), Sequencer (Roland System-100M-182, Roland MSQ-700), Sampler (Akai S1000), Macintosh (Power 7100/80AV), Backing vocals
- Masanori Chinzei – Engineering
- Satoshi Kon – Art director
- Hideki Namai – Photography

== Release history ==
Date	Label(s)	Format	Catalog	Notes
September 1, 1999	Chaos Union, Teslakite	MP3	PP-00001	All songs are available for download individually (cat. nos. PP-00010 – 19).
September 22, 1999	Magnet Records, Teslakite	CD	MAGL-5002	Packaged on a smart tray jewel case, with a small booklet and a strip of magnetic tape with project logo, TESLAKITE logo and catalogue number printed on it.
May 10, 2002; July 4, 2014	Chaos Union, Teslakite	CD	CHTE-0014	Remastered by Hirasawa. Part of Disc 10 of the Ashu-on [Sound Subspecies] in the solar system box set, alongside Virtual Live-1 and "Moon Plant-I". Re-released with new packaging by Kiyoshi Inagaki.

- "Logic Airforce" is included on the LIVE VIDEO Music Industrial Wastes〜P-MODEL OR DIE and MAGNET RECORDS/biosphere records PREMIUM DVD videos and the January 2000 Nikkei netn@vi and JAS SKI & SNOWBOARD 2001 CD-ROMs.
