= Fune (album) =

1995 studio album by P-Model

Studio album by P-Model
- Released: December 9, 1995
- Recorded: 1995
- Studio: Studio Wireself, Tokyo; Woodstock Studio, Karuizawa; Innig Recording Hostelry, Fujisawa ("Rocket Shoot" maxi-single)
- Genre: Electronic rock; electronica; experimental rock
- Length: 51:56
- Language: Japanese, Thai
- Label: Nippon Columbia
- Producer: P-Model

P-Model chronology
Big Body (1993)	Fune (1995)	Electronic Tragedy/〜ENOLA (1997)

Fune (舟, Ship) is the tenth studio album by P-Model and the first by its "revised" lineup.

== Overview ==
Following the dissolution of the "defrosted" lineup of P-Model, leader Susumu Hirasawa focused on his solo career, releasing Aurora and performing accompanying concerts. Some of the live shows featured a backing band, select members of which were sought by Hirasawa to join P-Model. Wataru Kamiryo, who worked with Hirasawa as the drummer of Soft Ballet in a special 1991 guest show, agreed to join. Kenji Konishi, a friend of Hirasawa's since 1979 who had collaborated with him intermittently since 1985, offered himself as a member, to Hirasawa's surprise. To fill out the fourth member role, Konishi convinced Hajime Fukuma, a chat room friend of his to join the band. This "revised" (改訂) lineup debuted with two shows in December 1994.

The recording of Fune started immediately after Hirasawa finished his solo album Sim City. His main technological interest of the time had switched from Amiga personal computers to the rapidly growing internet, leading the band to produce music based around this idea. Although the band members did use the internet on the making of the album, its presence on the recording process was minimal compared to their latter releases. Konishi and Fukuma worked alongside Hirasawa on his home studio; vocals, drums and analog multitrack mixing were done on a conventional recording facility.

As a concept album, it tells a story of the band dividing itself into two parties to sail through cyberspace and connect the opposing ideals of the spiritual and the technological. Hirasawa commented, "No, honestly, I think this might be the most easy-to-understand release in P-Model's history of works. The overall intended message is 'Come over here, it's super interesting, I'm already into it too, you're definitely gonna get hooked!'; a passionate invitation to the computer network."

Konishi had equal creative control as Hirasawa. His rhythmic style of songwriting coupled with Kamiryo's use of an acoustic drum kit resulted in a beat-heavy album. P-Model's overall sound changed due to the heavy layering of tracks with synths and other assorted electronics.

== Track listing ==
All tracks written by Susumu Hirasawa, except where noted. All tracks arranged by P-Model, except "Tide", by Hirasawa and Kenji Konishi.

No.	Title	Writer(s)	Length
1.	"Welcome"		4:18
2.	"Power to Dream" (夢見る力に Yume Miru Chikara ni)	Hirasawa, Kenji Konishi	3:54
3.	"Fune"	Hirasawa, Konishi	4:46
4.	"Wreckage Saksit" (残骸の船Saksit Zangai no Fune Saksit)		4:23
5.	"Preparation" (instrumental)	Konishi	4:09
6.	"Julia Bird"		3:57
7.	"Tide"		5:28
8.	"Soliton" (ソリトン)		3:17
9.	"Mirror Image"	Konishi	8:50
10.	"3/4 [March 4th]"	Konishi	5:56
11.	"Home" (instrumental)	Konishi	3:05

Ashu-on [Sound Subspecies] in the solar system disc 8 and 2011 reissue bonus tracks ("Rocket Shoot" maxi-single)
No.	Title	Writer(s)	Length
12.	"Rocket Shoot"		4:40
13.	"http"	Konishi	4:30
14.	"The Day of Beginning" (はじまりの日 Hajimari no Hi)	Hirasawa, Konishi	4:42

- "Mirror Image" contains samples of "Mental Manipulation", "Inner Tripping", "Percepts" and "Acoustic Space"; from the album The Medium is the Message (a posthumous compilation of Marshall McLuhan sound bites).

== Personnel ==
- Susumu Hirasawa – Vocals, Electric guitar, Synthesizers, Miburi, Sampler, Amiga, Vista, Sequencer, Programming, Production
- Hajime Fukuma – System-1, Backing vocals
- Kenji Konishi – System-2, Lead vocals on "Welcome" and "Fune", Backing vocals
- Wataru Kamiryo – AlgoRhythm
- Masayuki Momo – Synthesizer Programming
- Masanori Chinzei – Engineering
- Yūichi Kenjo – Production (Executive)

== Release history ==
Date	Label(s)	Format	Catalog	Notes
1995	Nippon Columbia	CD	TDCL-91201	Promotional version released to stores and press. Booklet contains an extensive biography and discography by Kasiko Takahasi.
December 9, 1995	Nippon Columbia	CD	COCA-13083	
May 10, 2002; July 4, 2014	Chaos Union, Teslakite	CD	CHTE-0012	Remastered by Hirasawa. Part of Disc 8 of the Ashu-on [Sound Subspecies] in the solar system box set, alongside the "Rocket Shoot" maxi-single. Re-released with new packaging by Kiyoshi Inagaki.
March 23, 2009	Columbia Music Entertainment	on Demand CD	CORR-10199	
September 21, 2011	Columbia Music Entertainment	CD	COCP-36928	Subtitled +3. Digitally remastered, with the "Rocket Shoot" maxi-single for bonus tracks.
September 21, 2011	Columbia Music Entertainment	Digital Download	none	Subtitled +3. Digitally remastered, with the "Rocket Shoot" maxi-single for bonus tracks.

== Corrective Errors ==
Corrective Errors remix of Fune

Remix album by P-Model
- Released: September 30, 1995
- Genre: Electronica; New-Age; Progressive; Trance
- Length: 56:28
- Label: disk UNION (DIW Records), SYUN
- Producer: P-Model

P-Model live/rearrange chronology
The Way of Live (1994)	Corrective Errors remix of Fune (1995)	SCUBA RECYCLE (1995)

Singles from Corrective Errors～remix of Fune
- 1. "SAKSIT North Passage MIX" c/w "11th fact" Released: February 29, 1996

Corrective Errors～remix of 舟 is an album of remixes by Hajime Fukuma and Kenji Konishi of songs from Fune, released on Hirasawa's own indie label SYUN. Released before Fune itself, it provided an early glimpse into the album. A single featuring a slightly different mix of "Wrecked Ship Saksit re-mix" was released as a special gift to consumers of SYUN releases. This was the last P-Model release pressed on vinyl.

=== Track listing ===
All tracks are written by Susumu Hirasawa and remixed by Kenji Konishi, except where noted.

No.	Title	Writer(s)	Remixer	Length
1.	"Tide re-mix"			8:03
2.	"Wrecked Ship Saksit re-mix" (残骸の船Saksit Zangai no Fune Saksit)			8:16
3.	"Julia Bird re-mix"		Hajime Fukuma	6:07
4.	"3/4 [March 4th] re-mix"	Konishi		8:32
5.	"Welcome re-mix"			8:03
6.	"Home re-mix"	Konishi	Fukuma	6:01
7.	"Fune re-mix"	Hirasawa, Konishi		11:26

Ashu-on [Sound Subspecies] in the solar system disc 16 bonus tracks
No.	Title	Writer(s)	Length
8.	"SAKSIT North Passage MIX"		8:53
9.	"11th fact" (Opening SE '94–'95)	Konishi	4:14

=== Release history ===
Date	Label(s)	Format	Catalog	Notes
May 25, 1994	disk UNION (DIW), SYUN	CD	SYUN-007	
May 10, 2002; July 4, 2014	Chaos Union, Teslakite	CD	CHTE-0020	Remastered by Hirasawa. Part of Disc 16 of the Ashu-on [Sound Subspecies] in the solar system box set, alongside its single. Re-released with new packaging by Kiyoshi Inagaki.
