= Potpourri (P-Model album) =

Studio album by P-Model
- Released: March 25, 1981
- Recorded: December 1980 – February 1981
- Studio: Sunrise Studio (recording and mixing), Ikebukuro, Toshima; Warner-Pioneer Studio, Roppongi, Minato; Tokyo
- Genre: No wave; ska-punk
- Length: 35:57
- Label: Warner-Pioneer
- Producer: P-Model

P-Model chronology
Landsale (1980)	Potpourri (1981)	Perspective (1982)

Singles from Potpourri
- 1. "junglebed II" c/w "disgusting telephone" Released: March 25, 1981 K-1502W

Potpourri is the third album of Japanese band P-Model.

== Overview ==
On the year of Landsale's release, the synthpop boom was reaching critical mass. Bandleader Susumu Hirasawa, feeling the group was in a state of crisis, distanced P-Model from the genre, trying to drive trend followers through rebellious episodes, and replacing their colorful clothing and equipment for a muted getup (black, white, gray and blue). At one concert, a leaflet titled "The Point of Coming to a Concert" was distributed while Landsale was looped endlessly through the PA system; the band did not play until the concertgoers started an uproar which led to a backlash against the band.

Bassist Katsuhiko Akiyama's creative position was in an opposite direction to where Hirasawa wanted to take P-Model, so he was fired from the band, and his songs were not played anymore. He was replaced by high school sophomore Tatsuya Kikuchi, a student of Hirasawa's at the Yamaha Synthesizer School. Kikuchi did not formally join the band while Potpourri was being recorded, leading Hirasawa and keyboardist Yasumi Tanaka to play bass parts on the album, each doing the songs they wrote.

Potpourri has a harsher and more off-putting sound than previous albums, with P-Model employing different instruments and experimental recording techniques. Guitar is more prominent than the keyboard-centric albums from before, leaving synthesizers to go almost unused. Hirasawa incorporates greater antagonism into his vocals, sometimes to the point of screaming them.

The album alienated P-Model's fanbase, leaving only a core audience that would persist with Hirasawa throughout his career.

== Track listing ==
All tracks are written by Susumu Hirasawa, except where noted.

No.	Title	Lyrics	Music	Length
1.	"junglebed I" (ジャングルベッドI jangurubeddo I)	instrumental		2:00
2.	"blue cross" (青十字 ao jūji)			2:36
3.	"junglebed II" (ジャングルベッドII jangurubeddo II)			3:49
4.	"blue print" (ブループリント burūpurinto)	Yasumi Tanaka	Tanaka	2:17
5.	"aqualife"	Hirasawa, Tanaka	Tanaka	2:51
6.	"different≠another"			2:21
7.	"anothersmell"	instrumental	Tanaka	1:47
8.	"film" (フィルム firumu)			2:52
9.	"monochrome screen" (モノクローム・スクリーン monokurōmu sukurīn)	Tanaka	Tanaka	2:52
10.	"marvel"			2:56
11.	"natural" (ナチュラル nachuraru)	Tanaka	Tanaka	2:55
12.	"disgusting telephone" (いまわし電話 imawashi denwa)			3:13
13.	"potpourri" (ポプリ popuri)			3:19

"film" contains an interpolation of Yoshiko Ishii's 1959 translation (originally performed and recorded by Ishii alongside the Dark Ducks) of the traditional French children's song "J'ai Perdu le Do de Ma Clarinette" (クラリネットをこわしちゃった, Kurarinetto wo Kowashi Chatta, French: 'I Lost My Clarinet's C', Japanese: 'I Broke My Clarinet'), believed to date no earlier than 1800.

In all releases of the album, the titles with Japanese characters listed are rendered only in them, except for the title track which is rendered as "potpourri (ポプリ)".

== Personnel ==
P-Model – production, arrangements

- Susumu Hirasawa – vocals, guitar, bass (1–3, 6, 8, 10, 12–13)
- Yasumi Tanaka – Combo organ, synthesizer, bass (4–5, 9, 11), echo machine, backing vocals
- Sadatoshi Tainaka – drums, cowbell, percussion, backing vocals

Visual staff

- Yūichi Hirasawa (credited as "you. hirasawa") – art director
- Hōseki Hirasawa – calligraphy
- Api Yomiya – photography
- Hiroshi Akasaka – art coordinator

Staff

- Makoto Furukawa – engineering, mixing
- Yukio Seto – A&R
- Kazuhiro Suzuki – production coordinator
- Model House – productive management
- special thanks to: Tatsuya Kikuchi, Masami Orimo

== Release history ==
Date	Label(s)	Format	Catalog	Notes
March 25, 1981	Warner-Pioneer	LP	K-12005W	
March 25, 1981	Warner-Pioneer	CS	LKF-7025	
January 25, 1992	Warner Music Japan	CD	WPCL-605	Released (alongside In a Model Room and Landsale) a month before the release of P-Model.
May 10, 2002; July 4, 2014	Chaos Union, Teslakite	CD	CHTE-0006	Remastered by Hirasawa. Part of Disc 2 of the Ashu-on [Sound Subspecies] in the solar system box set, alongside parts of the "Dual Perspective" & "Exercises for the Heavenizer" series of songs from 1981 & 1982. Re-released with new packaging by Kiyoshi Inagaki.
December 20, 2003	Warner Music Japan, sky station, SS RECORDINGS	CD	SS-103	Packaged in a paper sleeve to replicate the original LP packaging. Includes new liner notes by music industry writer Dai Onojima.

- The album's single was reissued on CD on a paper sleeve to replicate its original packaging with the band's other Warner-Pioneer released singles as part of the Tower Records exclusive Warner Years Singles Box box set in 2012.

== See also ==
- 1981 in Japanese music
