= Mandrake (Japanese band) =

Japanese progressive rock band

- Origin: Tokyo, Japan
- Genre: Progressive rock
- Years active: 1973–1978
- Labels: Marquee (Belle Antique, Avalon); Chaos Union (Teslakite)
- Past members: Fumiyasu Abe; Susumu Hirasawa; Sadatoshi Tainaka; Yasumi Tanaka; Hiromi Seki; Tohru Akutu
- Website: susumuhirasawa.com

Mandrake (マンドレイク) was a Japanese progressive rock band formed in Tokyo in 1973. One of the few Japanese groups active during the genre's heyday, they distinguished themselves by developing a style of their own, harder than the jazz fusion hybrid most other Japanese groups played.

They were unable to release any albums during their lifetime; by the point they were approached by a label, most of their members felt the genre was no longer capable of supporting the themes they wished to explore. New wave music had started to spread in the west by that point, a genre they saw as more fitting to their aims. After a farewell concert on New Year's Eve 1978, most of the band opted to reform as P-Model.

Guitarist Susumu Hirasawa is the only member that remains professionally active as a musician. He has kept traits of progressive rock part of his writing style but has no desire to fully reembrace the genre. Bootleg and demo recordings of some Mandrake songs were released over 2 albums in 1997, to date the only official releases of any material by the band.

== History ==
=== Formation and first lineup ===
By spring 1972, Shitamachi high schoolers Fumiyasu Abe (安部 文泰) and Susumu Hirasawa were musicians with unusual tastes unsatisfied with their playing opportunities. A mutual acquaintance advised Abe to visit Hirasawa, who hadn't been in a band in years and switched his hobby of choice to motocross. Hirasawa was intrigued at his aim to play "deranged music", but turned him down. (Note: "錯乱した音楽".) Not long after, a truck ran a red light and hit him, totaling his motorcycle. Lacking money to fix it, he took up Abe's proposal.

Their first attempt was a heavily improvisational originals band that made "an imitation of white people blues". (Note: "白人ブルースの真似事".) Abe was the vocalist while Hirasawa played electric guitar and blues harp, both used custom electronic devices to make sounds. They only got as far as playing one concert. The duo spent the rest of the year looking for like-minded fellows to form a band at and near the few established rock kissaten in Shinjuku, Kichijōji and Harajuku. Yet only saw a community of seediness and music tied to the entertainment industry. They briefly undertook a correspondence course on jazz as Hirasawa felt they could have better chances in that scene.

Their fortunes turned in late 1973 when two applicants answered an advertisement soliciting heavy rock musicians to meet at the Higashi-Koganei Station turnstiles. One was Yasumi Tanaka (田中 靖美) of Tama, another who did not fit the playing options school provided him. As the band had no bassist, he became one. The other, drummer Sadatoshi Tainaka (田井中 貞利), was an immigrant from Chikujō who had played with a 3/3 member.

From that day on, the quartet rehearsed weekly. For their first concert—a dance party for Takashimaya employees—they covered five Black Sabbath songs. During a train ride to a rehearsal, Abe and Hirasawa—propelled by an obsession with the Third Ear Band—decided to name the band "Mandrake" after thumbing through an alchemy book. They worked on original material, which pivoted stylistically towards progressive rock after Abe suddenly took up the violin, quickly completing the 19-minute long song "Deranged Door" (錯乱の扉, Sakuran no Tobira).

Hirasawa has called Mandrake's first concert featuring original material "an unforgettable day of humiliation". (Note: "忘れもしない屈辱の日".) Their 20-minute set opening for the campus band at a Rikkyo University festival was "Deranged Door", but they couldn't finish it. After doing the intro, drunks in the audience who wanted Deep Purple covers threw steel trash cans into the stage, the first hitting Tanaka.

Per Hirasawa, Abe "had a fickle personality". (Note: "気紛れな奴で".) At some point, he felt unable to play prog time signatures after his girlfriend broke up with him and disappeared following a bout of erratic behavior. Mandrake took this turn of events as an opportunity to reform and change their approach.

=== Second lineup and scene limitations ===
Before the changeup, Tanaka secretly learned to play piano—he felt it necessary to realize his ideas—and became the band's keyboardist. Tainaka expanded his drum kit with eight concert toms. Hirasawa became the new singer and lyricist reluctantly. With these changes, Mandrake fully embraced their progressive influences over their roots. Searching for a new bassist, Hirasawa approached a college classmate, Hiromi Seki (関 弘美), a fan of Eikichi Yazawa's rockabilly band Carol. After some chatting, Hirasawa successfully discerned that Pink Floyd's Atom Heart Mother could convert him. Seki did not know how to play his instrument before joining.

Mandrake incrementally built its profile with steady performances and self-promotion, amassing a following in the local prog scene. They gigged throughout Tokyo and Saitama; found venues willing to book prog bands regularly in Kichijōji, Shibuya and Warabi; billed alongside bands like Shingetsu, Anzen Bund, Space Circus and Blues Creation. A highlight for the group was their well-received set at the 1977 Tajimagahara Outdoor Concert in Sakura: the festival was beset by rain, but it stopped as Mandrake took the stage, and a rainbow formed behind them as they played.

However, throughout their existence, Mandrake struggled with the limitations of the culture they acted within. No prog scene formed then, and the genre did not take root commercially as the few bands active in Tokyo acted individually. Mirage (吉祥寺ミラージュ), a venue focused solely on prog, had a stage too small to fit Mandrake's Mellotron, who set the all-time highest attendance record there with 30 concertgoers. They found consistent booking in unusual venues like an event space inside a Dai-Ichi Katei Denki consumer electronics-oriented department store, and a restaurant.

Hirasawa did not get along with most other prog musicians due to aims and class differences. According to him, they wanted to pursue art and lyrical beauty, which he found boring. "Bands like Camel", as he put it. They also competed in gear: imported instruments were expensive in Japan then, particularly Mellotrons. First-hand units reached 980,000 yen; a band had three brand-new ones, while Mandrake—who balanced band activities with part-time jobs—bought theirs second-hand for 250,000 yen.

As the 1970s proceeded, jazz fusion—a style centred on technique—firmly established itself, and prog was constantly conflated with it. Hirasawa found the situation deeply humiliating, as Mandrake was booked alongside fusion groups often, despite entirely different aims. Shortly after the festival, he requested a solo set at the restaurant, where only three people stayed all the way through. Those three people were Abikyōkan (阿媚叫喚), a The Nice/Emerson, Lake & Palmer-influenced trio of high schoolers. The band befriended their leader, Katsuhiko Akiyama, who aided them as road crew on occasion. Abikyōkan would occasionally serve as their opening act afterwards.

After graduating in 1975, Seki returned to his native Niigata Prefecture to work on the family business. For about two years, he commuted weekly to Tokyo via shinkansen for the band. However, his family thought they were involved with the yakuza and barred him from continuing.

=== Third lineup and dissolution ===
Mandrake's third and final bassist was Tohru Akutu (阿久津 徹) of the recently disbanded Emerson, Lake & Palmer-inspired trio Hatenkō (破天荒). He expanded their sound via playing proficiency plus vocal contributions (backing and occasional lead parts) and increased in concertgoer turnout. The band also finalized the song "Happening by the Windowsill" (飾り窓の出来事, Kazari Mado no Dekigoto); with both factors, Akiyama felt they were close to debut. A Victor Music Industries A&R coordinator scouting prog bands reached out to them, initially to release an album by April 1978, but then postponed the plan.

In early 1978, the Electro Sound (エレクトロサウンド) corporation, then one of the few independent synthesizer-centric studios in Japan, hired Hirasawa. Among other endeavors, they operated the Yamaha Music Foundation courses on the instrument. That year, the company band The Bach Revolution (バッハ・リヴォリューション, Bahha Rivoryūshon) made Synthetic Study, a teaching tool for various uses of the Yamaha CS-10, recorded alongside Mandrake (all members are credited but the band name itself does not appear in the packaging) and a co-worker. It is an instrumental covers album of mostly pop songs, with three from Mandrake's genres. Hirasawa felt he "sold [his] soul" working on it. It is the only album Mandrake released during its lifetime.

Hirasawa entered a Weekly Playboy contest offering free synthesizers to talented amateurs who submitted high-quality multitrack recordings at a superior's advice. The Bach Revolution was part of the judging panel that selected the winners. His attempt, "Temptation from Necessity Bees" (いりよう蜂の誘惑, Iri-yō Hachi no Yūwaku), was praised by head judge Isao Tomita: "Outstanding composition. Top-level for a piece by an amateur. [...] It’s rich in wit, and the idea is great. There is a solid understanding of sound making. Perhaps calling him an amateur would be impolite, so it would be better to call him a professional". (Note: "構成力抜群。素人の作品としてはトップレべル。 [...] ウイットに富んでるし、アイデアもいい。オーディオ的な音創りがわかっている。素人というのは失礼で、プロ級といいかえた方がいいかな。") It, and all other winning entries, were released that same year as the Synthetic Space (恐るべき頭脳集団) compilation.

As the burgeoning punk and new wave movements developed in the west, their music and visuals reached Mandrake, who gradually cottoned to their approach and stylings. Hirasawa felt new wave was a genre with a meaning behind it, and as he listened to more of it concluded he could make it with the same motivation that led him to prog. His friends in other prog bands thought of it dismissively. He looked to Split Enz, who turned new wave but kept some prog elements, as a potential model to follow.

Besides the hands-on experience Electro Sound's assignments provided, it also allowed Hirasawa and Tanaka to develop a new approach to synths. The two wrote many new wave songs with this new sound, which Hirasawa thought had mainstream potential, and Mandrake played them. By September, when they appeared at that year's Tajimagahara festival, Mandrake was a half-hearted band. Three members already cut their waist-length hair short and were irritated with the scene. Hirasawa felt that prog lost its link to society and became pure entertainment with no growth prospects. As a genre focused solely on music it would never have wide appeal and had no media coverage. He estimated the limit of fans who would see Japanese bands live at 300 people. The maximum turnout they were able to attract was 150 people. After the festival, the A&R coordinator proposed that Mandrake make an album as a "souvenir" after learning they wanted to change styles. Hirasawa, who saw it as a paradigm shift and wanted to start from scratch, was incensed at the idea and rejected the offer.

Mandrake ended with a special 3-hour long show, not announced as their finale, at Shibuya Jean-Jean on New Year's Eve 1978, conceived by Hirasawa as commercialism defeating alchemy. It started with a two-hours-and-a-half-long set of prog songs, followed by a theatrical skit symbolizing the transition, and one half-hour-long set of new wave songs. After the performance and holiday celebrations, on New Year's Day 1979, the bandmembers and Susumu's brother Yūichi (平沢 裕一) convened at the Hirasawa family house in Kameari. They would define what direction to pursue, but first had a lengthy meeting concerning the Akutu rift.

The band's modus operandi was to work towards the same aim without talking about it. Hirasawa, Tanaka and Tainaka felt there was no point continuing with prog and shifted towards new wave this way; Akutu didn't. Per Akiyama, he seemed unaware of what his bandmates planned. He speculated it would be difficult for Akutu to reset himself for a simple genre, that he hoped for a debut as a progressive rock band. Tainaka once called him "prog from the core". (Note: "根っからプログレの人".) Ultimately, Akutu was fired from the band, who decided from that day onward to work as P-Model. Akiyama, like most of Mandrake, became disenchanted with prog and interested in the new genres. Hirasawa asked him to become P-Model's bassist because he had never played the instrument before.

=== Aftermath ===
Despite their intent, P-Model had many ties to progressive rock in their work. The Hirasawa brothers took cues from Split Enz and Jethro Tull in developing the band concept. Hirasawa struggled in writing simple music, so many of his compositions were far more complex than the genres he aspired to. Trying to find a record label willing to sign P-Model, Hirasawa gave a copy of their demo to the Victor A&R coordinator interested in Mandrake. He didn't want the new style and turned them down. To produce their first album, In a Model Room, he sought Masahide Sakuma, a member of Tokyo's most popular prog band (Yonin-Bayashi), also transitioning to new wave with a new group (Plastics). Later lineups of the band would contain Tadahiko Yokogawa (横川 理彦(タダヒコ)) and Kenji Konishi (小西 健司), both participants in the '70s Kansai progressive scene who also turned to new wave.

"I think that progressive rock isn’t a style of music but rather the direction that its impulse points to. So when prog becomes something that is simply a name for a formula, I don’t think that can be truly considered progressive. By the time this happened, I thought it was time to go on to the next thing, and while the style changed greatly I think the core foundation is the same as prog. And I had to question what prog… truly meant [laughs]."

— Susumu Hirasawa stance on the genre. (Note: "僕はプログレッシヴ・ロックというのは音楽の形態じゃなくて、その衝動が向いてる先・方向だと思うのね。だからプログレって言われてたものが、完全に単なる様式の名前になった時点で、もうそれはプログレじゃないと思うのね。ちょうどその時期に、もう次のことやらなきゃいけないと思ってて一気に形態は変えちゃったんだけど、基本的に流れてるものは、プログレだと思うんだけど。で、プログレは何だというと……悩んじゃった（笑）。")

Besides the early material written as new wave, Hirasawa repurposed 3 Mandrake songs for P-Model. The opening section of "Deranged Door" was slightly rewritten, with a faster tempo, as "The Great Brain" (偉大なる頭脳, Idainaru Zunō) for In a Model Room. "Alien" (異邦人, Ihōjin)—deemed too heavy for inclusion on their first album—underwent significant rewriting before its release on Landsale. A Mellotron line from Kimyō na Tamago (奇妙なタマゴ; "A Strange Egg") ultimately became the top synth melody of "Looping Opposition" from Scuba.

New wave was quickly absorbed by the industry, to Hirasawa's dismay. Fearing P-Model would be treated as part of a fad, the band went through a shift. He felt he had to preserve his "prog accent" to survive. 1984's Scuba, a concept album with guitar parts that returned to his '70s influences, is an early example of Hirasawa's reembracing of it. In 1988, as he prepared to shed the habits P-Model developed and embark on a solo career, he recorded "Happening by the Windowsill" alone. His continued exploring of concept albums with storylines and grand arrangements led to his solo works being called "modern prog" (現代のプログレ).

As P-Model developed a devoted following and the Japanese prog fanbase grew, interest mounted in the release of any Mandrake material. Bootlegs circulated among collectors; one prog-centric independent label went as far as pressing an unauthorized limited edition single with a unique multi-material jacket in the mid-'80s. The first official release of a Mandrake recording was in 1987 when a cassette containing "Deranged Door" was included in an auction lot amid other band belongings; it went unsold. Hirasawa owned a 4-track recorder during its lifetime, producing many private tapes.

In the 18 years following Mandrake's end, Hirasawa was adamant on never releasing the band's work, only relenting when coerced on his sickbed. Mandrake's only officially released albums came out in 1997, through a label specializing in progressive rock. Originally planned to be just one bootlegged concert, Hirasawa took a proactive role, bringing recordings from his archive and making alterations to each track for release. In total—across two albums—one song by the first lineup, five by the third, "Temptation from Necessity Bees" and the solo recording of "Happening by the Windowsill" were released. The producer wanted to include the ballad Yoru ni Nattara (夜になったら; "When Night Comes"), but Hirasawa vetoed it. The first album contains more intricate compositions, while the second features more experimental work. Both albums were reissued in 2006 by Hirasawa's self-owned independent label. Multiple Mandrake songs remain officially unreleased.

Of Mandrake's six members, Hirasawa is the only one actively following a professional career in music. Tainaka fully retired from the public eye in 2000, Tanaka retired from the industry in 1983 but has made sporadic public contributions since 2013. Hirasawa mentioned Abe's whereabouts in 1986 thus: "He's a chef now. It seems like he still wants to do something, though, and shows up at Hibiya Park wearing a lab coat and holding a violin". (Note: "今はそいつ板前してます。今でも何かやりたいらしくて、白衣着て、バイオリン持って、日比谷公園あたりに現われてるようだけど".) Hirasawa and Seki reconnected at some point, collaborating in the 1987 Shun mini-album Shun・4. Akutu joined Shingetsu offshoots shortly after Mandrake's demise, appearing on "Slip into the Sea" (海にとけこんで, Umi ni Tokekonde), a 1980 recording included in 2005's The Whole Story of Shingetsu (新●月●全●史) boxset.

== Creative approach ==
For Hirasawa, progressive rock made him consider that music has meaning only when it functions within society. He was equally attracted to it for the visuals and conceptual backing as he was for the music. He was concerned about prog fans misunderstanding what Mandrake went for and wanted them to interpret it beyond just the musical aspect. Musing retrospectively, Masaki Takazawa (高沢 正樹) of the Urawa Rock 'n' Roll Center—a concert planning group that often booked Mandrake—felt they stood apart from their peers: "I never thought they were simply following a trend. Their 'prog' would try to enter an aesthetic world while also desperately trying to find an exit, showing a conflicting range that gave an impression of hidden frustration". (Note: "だがもともと彼らの「プログレ」は、耽美的な世界に入りこもうとする一方で、出口を求めて必死にあがいているようなアンビバレンツな振幅があり、激しい苛立ちを内包している印象があったから、単に流行に便乗したとは全然思わなかった".)

=== Musicianship ===
Tanaka attributes the shift away from heavy metal to Tainaka: "The change in music taste was, you could say simultaneous, everyone moved on naturally. We had similarities because we were similar. Of course, we shared vinyl records. I’m not one to actively listen to a variety of music. Tainaka, though, was quite amazing. He was quick to buy to the point where I wanted to tell him to throw them out. He’d bring eerily strange records. And we’d give them a listen". (Note: "音楽の好みの流れっていうのは、同時多発っていうか、全員自然に移り変わっていったみたいね。仲間だからもともと共通項を持ってるでしょう。やっぱりレコードの貸し借りとかするし。僕なんかは自分で積極的にいろんなものを聴くほうじゃないですけど。田井中は、すごかったなぁ。もう捨てろって言いたくなるぐらいね、すぐ買う。ヘンな得体の知れないレコードまで買って持ってる。で、一応みんなで聴くと") Tainaka thinks it started when he got into King Crimson.

While progressive rock traits are apparent in their songs, there is no clear-cut single foreign band that Mandrake modeled itself on, unlike regional contemporaries Shingetsu and Bi Kyo Ran. Hirasawa describes their heavy sound as "Like Van der Graaf Generator. And King Crimson. So, like Robert Fripp joined Van der Graaf Generator". (Note: "ヴァンダー・グラフみたいなやつ。と、クリムゾンが合わさったようなやつ。だからヴァンダー・グラフにロバート・フリップが入ったようなやつ".) Akiyama finds it comparable to Yes and Genesis. Mandrake occasionally played "Mirrors", "Larks' Tongues in Aspic" and "Mood for a Day" during practice. Critics agree with these comparisons, also finding similarities with Tangerine Dream; Nektar; Emerson, Lake & Palmer; Outer Limits; Eloy; Beggars Opera and krautrock in general.

Besides the Fripp and Steve Howe influence on Hirasawa as a guitarist, Tanaka also notes his fondness for Tony Iommi's "inorganic, mechanical" sound. As a vocalist, Hirasawa's early role models were Inga Rumpf of Frumpy (for appearance and stage presence) and Demis Roussos of Aphrodite's Child (for voice and singing style). Both bandmembers and outsiders considered his vocals weak and that he approached the role only out of necessity. For inspiration to write lyrics, he looked to those by the vocalist of Yūichi's band Jōji Maion (じょうじマョン), who advised him to read Kenji Miyazawa. Abe wrote lyrics in English; as Hirasawa's grasp of the language was poor, he mostly wrote in Japanese and rewrote Abe's. They are noted for lyricism and drama present in few of later Hirasawa's songs and display an already-formed narrative voice.

Tanaka, who sees instruments as tools to materialize his ideas and has no attachment to them, took up keyboards due to their coolness and the flamboyance of players like Keith Emerson. His style is comparable to Emerson's as well as Rick Wakeman's. Akutu modeled himself—both visually and towards gear picks—on Greg Lake.

Except for Akutu, Mandrake's members didn't prioritize playing skills but many were very proficient at it. Their songs were meticulously written and tightly structured due to their Black Sabbath influence. A key feature of their style is the lack of improvisation, as Tanaka found it boring. That placed them in sharp contrast with most Japanese prog bands of the time.

=== Visual presentation ===
Mandrake painted their equipment in a variety of colors.

They worked alongside Device Mandragora (ディバイス・マンドラゴラ), a lighting and stage effects team led by Yūichi, assisted by four others. Featured effects include handmade lighting rigs, disco balls, fog machines and giant rocks floating in the air. Weather balloons filled partway through shows doubled as projection screens for slideshows and animations directly drawn on 8 mm film with needles. Yūichi estimates their success rate as 50%.

The final concert featured a giant picture frame that came apart during the style change skit (which starred Yūichi and Akiyama as mad scientists), a treadmill and a glowing multicolored fetus.

== Legacy ==
Mandrake was incapable of flourishing in its environment and its albums are criticized for poor recording quality often. Their release led the band to their recognition as pioneers of Japanese progressive rock, one of the time's most original.

The 1973 song "Deranged Door" in particular has gotten attention for its dark and heavy style. Comparable to albums by Britain's most acclaimed prog bands it precedes.

Their output is also analyzed in relation to P-Model's and Hirasawa's over the decades, as compositional traits reoccur over all three oeuvres.

== Members ==
- Fumiyasu Abe (安部 文泰) – vocals and violin (1973–c. 1974)
- Susumu Hirasawa (平沢 進) – guitar (1973–1978), vocals (c. 1974–1978)
- Yasumi Tanaka (田中 靖美) – bass (1973–c. 1974); synthesizer, Mellotron, Hammond organ (c. 1974–1978)
- Sadatoshi Tainaka (田井中 貞利) – drums (1973–1978)
- Hiromi Seki (関 弘美) – bass (c. 1974–c. 1977)
- Tohru Akutu (阿久津 徹) – bass and vocals (c. 1977–1978)

== Discography ==
=== Archival albums ===
Title	Release details
Unreleased Materials vol.1	Released: 25 March 1997; Label: Marquee, Belle Antique; Format: CD
Unreleased Materials vol.2	Released: 21 May 1997; Label: Marquee, Avalon; Format: CD

=== Collaborative album ===
Other performers	Title	Release details
The Bach Revolution; Takashi Kokubo (小久保 隆)	Synthesizer Study	Released: 1978; Label: Teichiku, Overseas; Format: 12-inch vinyl

=== Bootleg single ===
Title	Release details
"Happening by the Windowsill" (飾り窓の出来事, Kazari Mado no Dekigoto)	Released: c. 1984–1985; Label: Athene, Diskport, Made in Japan; Format: 7-inch vinyl
