= Demo (P-Model single) =

"demo"

Single by P-Model
- Released: May 25, 1994
- Recorded: 1979; Electro Sound; Tokyo
- Genre: Post-punk, electropunk, electronic rock, new wave, technopop
- Length: 6:31
- Label: DIW Records, SYUN
- Producer(s): Susumu Hirasawa

P-Model singles chronology
"OPENING SE 1992" (1992)	"demo" (1994)	"SAKSIT North Passage MIX" (1996)

P-Model made a demo in 1979 to obtain a recording contract; it features 2 songs, each one being composed by Susumu Hirasawa and Yasumi Tanaka, P-Model's main songwriters at the time. The band negotiated with 8 record labels, in the end, they chose to sign a contract with Warner-Pioneer, all P-MODEL releases from 1979 to 1981 (3 albums and 3 singles) were handled by Warner-Pioneer, including In A Model Room, the album where both of these songs were included. Hirasawa also gave a copy to Plastics keyboardist Masahide Sakuma after a Plastics show after asking him to produce In a Model Room, which Sakuma accepted. Due to the demo nature of the recordings, they are rawer and punkier than the studio recorded versions. The demo was released by Hirasawa's SYUN label in 1994 as a bonus for those who bought both OOPARTS and Pause, the first release of the SYUN label (due to its nature, the demo received a catalogue number outside of the standard numbering convention of the SYUN label). The demo was remastered by Hirasawa and re-released on the Ashu-on [Sound Subspecies] in the solar system box set on 10 May 2002; it was put on CD 13, with SCUBA RECYCLE, Air on the Wiring and the In a Model Room outtake WHITE SHOES.

== Track listing ==
No.	Title	Writer(s)	Length
1.	"bijutsu-kan de atta hito daro"	Susumu Hirasawa	3:04
2.	"roomrunner"	Yasumi Tanaka	3:27

== Personnel ==
- Susumu Hirasawa – vocals, guitar, synthesizer, production, engineering
- Yasumi Tanaka – bass, combo organ, synthesizers, drum machine, sequencer, backing vocals, engineering
- Sadatoshi Tainaka – drums
