= Big Body (album) =

Studio album by P-Model
- Released: March 25, 1993
- Recorded: October–December 1992
- Studio: Eggs, Shep Studio, Oshino, Minamitsuru, Yamanashi; Key-Stone Studio, Ōhashi, Meguro, Tokyo; Tokyu Fun Digital Mastering Room (mast.), Dōgenzaka, Shibuya, Tokyo
- Genre: Electronica; industrial
- Length: 35:19
- Label: Polydor K.K.
- Producer: Susumu Hirasawa; Yūichi Kenjo (co.)

P-Model chronology
| P-Model (1992) | Big Body (1993) | Fune (1995) |

Big Body (stylized as big body) is the ninth studio album by P-Model and the second by the band's "defrosted" lineup.

== Overview ==
Following in the footsteps of the self-titled P-Model, Big Body is another take on a science fiction themed album, putting greater emphasis on melodic variety.

== Track listing ==
All tracks are written by Susumu Hirasawa, except where noted.

| No. | Title | Writer(s) | Length |
|---|---|---|---|
| 1. | "Cluster" | | 3:44 |
| 2. | "Chevron" | | 3:14 |
| 3. | "Biiig Eye" | | 3:32 |
| 4. | "Big Foot" | | 3:36 |
| 5. | "Welcome to the House of 'Time's Leaking Through Equal Distance Curve'" (時間等曲率漏斗館へようこそ Jikantō Kyokuritsu Rōtokan e Yōkoso, Welcome to the House of Chrono-Synclastic Infundibulum) | | 3:19 |
| 6. | "Journey Through Your Body" | Katsuhiko Akiyama | 3:38 |
| 7. | "Neoteny Box" (幼形成熟BOX Yō Keisei Juku BOX) | Hikaru Kotobuki | 2:39 |
| 8. | "Burning Brain" | Akiyama | 4:06 |
| 9. | "Binary Ghost" | | 2:40 |
| 10. | "Homo Gestalt" | | 4:44 |

"Biiig Eye" contains a sample of "Loud, Loud, Loud" by Aphrodite's Child (lyrics by Costas Ferris).

All tracks arranged by Hirasawa, except 6 & 8 by Akiyama and 7 by Kotobuki. All track titles are stylized in all caps.

== Personnel ==
P-Model

- Susumu Hirasawa – vocals, electric guitar, synthesizers, Amiga ("Say" program – lead vocals on "Binary Ghost"), programming, producer, computer graphics
- Katsuhiko Akiyama – synthesizers, vocoder, programming, lead vocals on "Journey Through Your Body" and "Burning Brain", backing vocals
- Hikaru Kotobuki – synthesizers, Compact Macintosh, programming, lead vocals on "Neoteny Box", backing vocals
- Yasuchika Fujii – electronic drums

technical

- Masanori Chinzei (Magnet) – engineer (mixing and recording)
- Motohiro Yamada (Eggs, Shep Studio), Harumi Ohta (Mix) – assistant engineers
- Keiko Ueda (Tokyu Fun) – mastering engineer

visuals

- Masahiro Kubo (VF) – art director, design
- Hideki Namai – photography
- Kazunori Yoshida – hair & make-up
- Akemi Tsujitani – styling
- Yoshino Takatsuki – costume design

operations

- Osamu Takeuchi (Polydor K.K.) – director
- I_{3} Promotion – artist management
  - Yūichi Kenjo – co-producer
- Hiroki Yamaguchi – personal manager
- Shoko Mashio, Saya Ohta, Yuki Abiko – publicity coordination
- Tsutomu Fukushima – stage coordination
- Masami Fujii, Roppei Iwagami (Pre Octave) – publisher

thanks

- Tenney Tsuji, Yuji Matsuda, Susumu Kunisaki, Arai & Co., AC Unit
- Akiyama special thanks: Tetsuji Fujita

== Release history ==
| Date | Label(s) | Format | Catalog | Notes |
|---|---|---|---|---|
| March 25, 1993 | Polydor K.K. | CD | POCH-1195 | |
| May 10, 2002; July 4, 2014 | Chaos Union, Teslakite | CD | CHTE-0011 | Remastered by Hirasawa. Part of Disc 7 of the Ashu-on [Sound Subspecies] in the solar system box set, alongside P-Model. Re-released with new packaging by Kiyoshi Inagaki. |
| September 8, 2004; December 5, 2012 | UM³, USM Japan | CD | UPCY-6022; UPCY-9273 | Part of the "GOLDEN☆BEST" budget bundle brand, packaged with P-Model. Reissue available for sale for a limited time. |
| May 2, 2012 | Universal Music Japan, Tower Records | CD | PROT-1023 | Limited reissue, sold only through Tower Records. |
