= Landsale (album) =

Studio album by P-Model
- Released: April 25, 1980
- Recorded: February 1980
- Studio: Aoi Studio 1st (Recording) & 7th (Mixing), Azabu-Jūban, Minato, Tokyo
- Genre: New wave; synthpop
- Length: 37:28
- Label: Warner-Pioneer
- Producer: P-Model

P-Model chronology
| In a Model Room (1979) | Landsale (1980) | Potpourri (1981) |

Singles from Landsale
- 1. "Missile c/w "'Love' Story" Released: April 25, 1980 WQCQ-298

Landsale is P-Model's second album.

== Overview ==
Landsale bears similarity to the debut In A Model Room, with sarcastic lyrics to the background of a nervous and energetic sound. The songs are more aggressive, with the exception of opening track "Ohayo".

Landsale went on to become the band's only chart-topping album. Hirasawa re-recorded most of the album in 1999 as Virtual Live-2 [P-Model Live at Shibuya Nylon 100% 1980].

== Track listing ==
All tracks are written by Susumu Hirasawa, except where noted.

| No. | Title | Writer(s) | Length |
|---|---|---|---|
| 1. | "Ohayo" (オハヨウ) | | 4:50 |
| 2. | "Daijobu" (ダイジョブ) | | 3:05 |
| 3. | "'Love' Story" (「ラヴ」ストーリー 「Ravu」 Sutōrī) | Yasumi Tanaka | 2:41 |
| 4. | "Doctor Stop" (ドクター・ストップ Dokutā Sutoppu) | | 3:21 |
| 5. | "Touch Me" (タッチ ミー Tatchi Mī) | Katsuhiko Akiyama | 3:18 |
| 6. | "Na-Ka-Yo-Shi" (ナ・カ・ヨ・シ) | Akiyama | 2:15 |
| 7. | "Missile" (ミサイル Misairu) | | 2:43 |
| 8. | "Little Boy" (リトル ボーイ Ritoru Bōi) | Tanaka | 2:41 |
| 9. | "I Am Only Your Model" | | 2:34 |
| 10. | "One Way Love" (ワン ウェイ ラヴ Wan Wei Ravu) | | 2:47 |
| 11. | "Alien" (異邦人 Ihōjin) | Tanaka (music), Hirasawa | 4:08 |
| 12. | "Globe" (地球儀 Chikyūgi) | Akiyama | 3:04 |

== Personnel ==
P-Model - Production, Arrangements

- Susumu Hirasawa - Lead vocals, Backing vocals on "Touch Me", Guitar, Synthesizer
- Yasumi Tanaka - Combo organ, Synthesizers, Sequencer, Piano on "Ohayo", Backing vocals
- Sadatoshi Tainaka - Drums, Percussion
- Katsuhiko Akiyama - Bass, Synth bass, Piano on "Na-Ka-Yo-Shi", Backing vocals, Lead vocals on "Touch Me"

Guest musicians & production

- Noriko Amano Group - Strings on "Ohayo"
- Makoto Furukawa - Engineering, Mixing
- Michio Kawamata & Shunichi Kusayanagi - Assistant Engineering

Staff

- Tomonari Sassa - Direction
- Yūichi Hirasawa (credited as "You Hirasawa") - Art director
- Takuya Usami & Hideki Namai - Photography
- Model House - Productive Management
- Thanks to: 21st Wonderland, Yūkun, Āchan, Masakazu Iwanari & many others

== Release history ==
| Date | Label(s) | Format | Catalog | Notes |
|---|---|---|---|---|
| April 25, 1980 | Warner-Pioneer | LP | K-10020W | |
| April 25, 1980 | Warner-Pioneer | CS | LKF-5038 | |
| January 25, 1992 | Warner Music Japan | CD | WPCL-604 | Released (alongside In a Model Room and Potpourri) a month before the release of P-Model. |
| May 10, 2002; July 4, 2014 | Chaos Union, Teslakite | CD | CHTE-0005 | Remastered by Hirasawa. Part of Disc 1 of the Ashu-on [Sound Subspecies] in the solar system box set, alongside In a Model Room. Re-released with new packaging by Kiyoshi Inagaki. |
| November 20, 2003 | Warner Music Japan, sky station, SS RECORDINGS | CD | SS-102 | Packaged in a paper sleeve to replicate the original LP packaging. Includes new liner notes by music industry writer Dai Onojima. |

- "Daijobu" is included on the Burst! New Wave 1980 various artists compilation.
- The album's single was reissued on CD on a paper sleeve to replicate its original packaging with the band's other Warner-Pioneer released singles as part of the Tower Records exclusive Warner Years Singles Box box set in 2012.

== See also ==
- 1980 in Japanese music
