= Bara no Seidou =

Studio album by Malice Mizer
- Released: August 23, 2000
- Studios: On Air Azabu Studio; Hitokuchizaka Studio; Warner Music Recording Studio; Onkio Haus
- Genre: Neoclassical dark wave
- Length: 50:34
- Labels: Midi:Nette, Trisol Music Group (2007 re-release)
- Producer: Malice Mizer

Malice Mizer chronology
Shinwa (2000)	Bara no Seidou (2000)

Singles from Bara no Seidou
- 1. "Saikai no Chi to Bara" Released: November 3, 1999; 2. "Kyomu no Naka de no Yūgi" Released: May 31, 2000; 3. "Shiroi Hada ni Kurū Ai to Kanashimi no Rondo" Released: July 26, 2000; 4. "Mayonaka ni Kawashita Yakusoku" Released: October 30, 2001

Bara no Seidou (薔薇の聖堂) is the fourth and final album by the Japanese visual kei rock band Malice Mizer, released on August 23, 2000. The title roughly translates as "Church of Roses" or "Sanctuary of Roses". In February 2007, Bara no Seidou was re-released by German record label Trisol Music Group, packaged in both jewel case and limited slipcase versions, both including the Cardinal music video collection DVD.

== Influences ==
Bara no Seidou is a major change from Malice Mizer's previous albums with less of a focus on the twin guitar sound that was present in their previous discography, but retaining a chameleon trait like artists such as Genesis and Roxy Music. The band's sound switched from an ordinary art rock sound into a dark, gothic metal one; however, they still continued to use the violins, harpsichords and other instruments present in their older works and also added in a pipe organ and a choir for a haunting, melancholic, and religious feel to the album. For example, the song "Seinaru Toki Eien no Inori" is based around an organ and choir but still includes dual guitars and drums, which gives it a gothic metal feel. Fan favorite "Kyomu no Naka de no Yūgi" is a track that uses an organ and harpsichord mixed with a synthesizer and drum machine for more of a dark wave element. This song is influenced by gothic rock/industrial music and features a different image in its video, but still retains the dark themes of the album.

After the death of Kami, it could be argued that the "funeral goth" element present in their attire is because of his death, and the song "Saikai no Chi to Bara" is a reference, and tribute, to him.

== Live promotion ==
The band released the DVD Bara ni Irodorareta Akui to Higeki no Makuake of their two-day live concert at the Nippon Budokan. Like their previous tour, "Merveilles L'Espace", this tour was very theatrical, having a Gothic cathedral on the cover of the album as a stage prop and a moon that changed colors several times during the performance. However, unlike the previous tours, it did not completely consist of the members playing their instruments and relied more on the theatrics.

== Track listing ==
All tracks are written by Mana, except tracks #4 and #7 by Közi.

No.	Title	Length
1.	"Bara ni Irodorareta Akui to Higeki no Makuake" (薔薇に彩られた悪意と悲劇の幕開け; A Prelude of Malice and Misery, Painted by the Rose)	0:29
2.	"Seinaru Toki Eien no Inori" (聖なる刻 永遠の祈り; Holy Time, Eternal Prayer)	8:13
3.	"Kyomu no Naka de no Yūgi" (虚無の中での遊戯; Amusement in Nihilism)	6:38
4.	"Kagami no Butou Genwaku no Yoru" (鏡の舞踏 幻惑の夜; Mirror Dance, Night of Bewitchment)	3:54
5.	"Mayonaka ni Kawashita Yakusoku" (真夜中に交わした約束; Promises Exchanged at Midnight)	6:01
6.	"Chinurareta Kajitsu" (血塗られた果実; Blood-stained Fruit)	4:39
7.	"Chikasuimyaku no Meiro" (地下水脈の迷路; Labyrinth of Underground Rivers)	5:28
8.	"Hakai no Hate" (破誡の果て; Blasphemy's Culmination)	4:01
9.	"Shiroi Hada ni Kurū Ai to Kanashimi no Rondo" (白い肌に狂う愛と哀しみの輪舞; Rondo of Love and Sadness, Driven Mad by the White Skin)	5:40
10.	"Saikai no Chi to Bara" (再会の血と薔薇; The Blood and Rose of Reunion)	5:31

== Personnel ==
=== Malice Mizer ===
- Mana – synthesizers, guitar (2,4,8,9), drum machine (3-7)
- Közi – synthesizers, guitar (2,4,8,9), vocals (3,6,10), drum machine on 3–7
- Yu~ki – bass guitar, vocals (3,10), drum machine (3–7)
- Klaha – vocals (2,4,5,6,8,9)
- Kami – "eternal blood relative" (credited but does not perform)

=== Other contributors ===
- Shu – drums
- Maki Okada – vocals (2)
- Youko Takai – vocals (7)
- Yuichiro Goto – strings (2), violin (4,9,10)
- Motohide Tanaka – director
- Masao Nakazato – mastering
- Teruhisa Abe – art direction, design
- Kenji Tsukagoshi – photography
- Taqueya Yamashita – cover art
- Yukie Itoh – executive producer

== Charts ==
Chart performance for Bara no Seidou
Chart (2000)	Peak position
Japanese Albums (Oricon)	17
