= Electronic Tragedy: Enola =

Studio album by P-Model
- Released: November 29, 1997
- Recorded: 1997
- Studio: Various: Studio Parkside, Minami, Toda, Saitama; Master Recording Studio, Bangkok; Internal Studio, Bangkok; Studio Sonic Garden, Yoyogi, Shibuya, Tokyo (maxi-single mixing)
- Genre: Electronic rock; electronica; experimental rock
- Length: 43:03
- Label: Nippon Columbia, TESLAKITE
- Producer: P-Model

P-Model chronology
Fune (1995)	Electronic Tragedy: Enola (1997)	Music Industrial Wastes〜P-MODEL OR DIE (1999)

Singles from Electronic Tragedy/〜ENOLA
- 1. "ASHURA CLOCK" Released: August 1, 1997 COCA-14390; 2. "LAYER-GREEN" Released: August 30, 1997 COCA-14391

Electronic Tragedy: Enola, stylized as Electronic Tragedy/〜ENOLA (電子悲劇/〜ENOLA, Denshi Higeki/〜ENOLA), is the eleventh studio album by P-Model and the second by its "revised" lineup.

== Background ==
In October 1996, P-Model started their project Amorphous Cruise System (不定形巡航体制, Futeikei Junkō Taisei), codenamed "Unfix", a 9-part venture where each member (or "branch") would work in projects either independently of the band or with other members in different formations, culminating with all branches merging again. The members were able to enact Unfixes No. 0, #1, No. 2, #4 and No. 6 successfully, with No. 1 being the band's enhanced maxi single "Rocket Shoot". The project reached setbacks when Susumu Hirasawa was unable to come to Unfix No. 3, an all-night event which was supposed to have participation from every member, due to sudden illness and when Unfix No. 5, also a live event, was cancelled. The original plan was abandoned for good with the departure of drummer Wataru Kamiryo from the band, which made the end goal of merging all branches impossible. That led to Hirasawa to reconceptualize the project.

The reworked concept was centered around a story, Search for the LAYER-GREEN Crisis Protocol (レイヤー・グリーンの危機議定書(プロトコル)を探せ, REIYĀ-GURĪN no Kiki Purotokoru wo Sagase), which unfolded through maxi singles, the album, HTML and video files included in those releases, live shows, that year's World Inspection Tour and the internet, which the band used to post reports and set forth tasks for concertgoers through its official bulletin board system; all of this made it essentially like one of Hirasawa's Interactive Lives, but done with P-Model.

The story revolves around LAYER-GREEN, a three-dimensional "information sphere" representation of the internet, and was made to have people understand the feeling of being in an internet community, and to maybe make them want to buy a computer. Shortly after the project's end, Hirasawa felt that it wasn't as conceptually realized as his Interactive Lives, excessively enthusiastic and wasn't as adamant about its points anymore.

The idea of LAYER-GREEN was inspired by a vacation Hirasawa took in Bali in late 1996, amazed by the fractal patterns that he saw on a temple and its nearby jungle, as well as gamelan music, feeling that Bali was techno music itself. This Asian inspiration also manifested in the music made for the album.

== Composition and production ==
Electronic Tragedy/〜ENOLA is the only P-Model album where less than half of its songs were written by Hirasawa, containing a "balanced" number of tracks for each member, sequenced to cycle through all of them. Kamiryo had prepared material for the album as well, and had he not left the band, there would have been less Hirasawa compositions than it ended up with. Since he wasn't the main creative force, Hirasawa did not have to consciously change his style for the album as a whole to have a different sound.

Hajime Fukuma, who was not content with making only "bonus material" following the release of "Rocket Shoot", sought to actively participate on the project. Some of his contributions aimed for a P-Model feel, but he also tried to include arrangement touches that the other members either would not use or opposed using on their own material and easy to understand technopop songs.

For Electronic Tragedy/〜ENOLA and its two preceding maxi singles, P-Model significantly digitized its workflow. Every member had a Roland VS-880 hard disk recorder, so almost all electronics were recorded on their home studios. They communicated online about their songs, sending low-quality RealAudio files of their demos to each other for review, changing aspects as discussion went on. They later convened in Thai studios to listen to the others' songs in high-quality and to record vocals. After recording was finished, they then went to a Tokyo studio to transfer their recordings to tape and mixdown.

For the inclusion of enhanced material, the group faced issues with the way the music industry was and undertook a big financial risk doing it. Extra staff was brought in create and ship the content. Nippon Columbia would not give them royalties for any non-music content, and could not think of packaging in any terms other than music packaging, so the band incurred extra costs trying to adapt to the different format.

== Track listing ==
No.	Title	Lyrics	Music	Length
1.	"ENOLA"	Susumu Hirasawa	Hirasawa	4:22
2.	"HIDDEN PROTOCOL" (release 2)	Kenji Konishi	Konishi	4:07
3.	"BOGY"	Hirasawa, Hajime Fukuma	Fukuma	3:37
4.	"Rocket Shoot II"	Hirasawa	Hirasawa	4:40
5.	"ENN"	Konishi	Konishi	4:08
6.	"Satellite ALONE" (衛星ALONE Eisei ALONE)	Hirasawa, Fukuma	Fukuma	4:30
7.	"LAYER-GREEN" (ver. 1.05 Gold)	Hirasawa	Hirasawa	4:09
8.	"Spiritus"	Konishi	Konishi	3:20
9.	"ASHURA CLOCK" (Discommunicator)	Hirasawa	Hirasawa, Fukuma	4:00
10.	"Black in White"	Hirasawa	Hirasawa	4:33
11.	"A Strange Fruit"	instrumental	Konishi	2:57

Ashu-on [Sound Subspecies] in the solar system disc 9 and 2011 reissue bonus tracks ("ASHURA CLOCK" & "LAYER-GREEN" maxi-singles)
No.	Title	Lyrics	Music	Length
12.	"ASHURA CLOCK"			4:12
13.	"COLORS"	Hirasawa, Fukuma	Fukuma	3:59
14.	"HIDDEN PROTOCOL"			4:25
15.	"LAYER-GREEN"			4:09
16.	"BA-DA-DHA"	Hirasawa	Hirasawa	3:37
17.	"AFFIRMATION"	Konishi	Konishi	3:24

== Personnel ==
- Susumu Hirasawa – Vocals, Electric guitar, Synthesizers, Sampler, Amiga, Sequencer, Programming
- Hajime Fukuma – System-1, Lead vocals on "BOGY", Backing vocals
- Kenji Konishi – System-2, Lead vocals on "ENN", Backing vocals
- Natthacha Yodsoongnern – Narration on "BOGY"
- Masanori Chinzei – Mixing and Recording Engineer
- Akinori Yoshino – Mixing (maxi-singles only) and Recording Engineer
- Hideki Namai – Photography
- Toshiyuki Akimoto – Direction

== Release history ==
Date	Label(s)	Format	Catalog	Notes
November 29, 1997	Nippon Columbia	enhanced CD	COCA-14673	Comes in a white slipcase with clear circular sections that almost entirely match up with photos of the band members and the maxi-single covers on the CD's label, with the "rear" as the front. To serve that purpose, there is no inlay. The reverse side of the slipcase is striped.
May 10, 2002; July 4, 2014	Chaos Union, Teslakite	CD	CHTE-0013	Remastered by Hirasawa. Part of Disc 9 of the Ashu-on [Sound Subspecies] in the solar system box set, alongside the "ASHURA CLOCK" and "LAYER-GREEN" maxi-singles. Re-released with new packaging by Kiyoshi Inagaki.
September 24, 2009	Columbia Music Entertainment	on Demand CD	CORR-10418	
September 21, 2011	Columbia Music Entertainment	CD	COCP-36929	Subtitled +6. Digitally remastered, with the "ASHURA CLOCK" and "LAYER-GREEN" maxi-singles for bonus tracks. The CD label design is changed to a solid colors one.
September 21, 2011	Columbia Music Entertainment	Digital Download	none	Subtitled +6. Digitally remastered, with the "ASHURA CLOCK" and "LAYER-GREEN" maxi-singles for bonus tracks. The CD label design is changed to a solid colors one.
