= Perspective (P-Model album) =

1982 studio album by P-Model

Studio album by P-Model
- Released: March 1, 1982
- Studios: Sunrise Studio, Ikebukuro, Toshima, Tokyo
- Genres: Post-punk; industrial rock; no wave
- Length: 32:36
- Labels: Tokuma, Japan
- Producer: P-Model

P-Model chronology
Potpourri (1981)	Perspective (1982)	Another Game (1984)

Perspective is P-Model's fourth album.

== Overview ==
Perspective has a tense atmosphere, a continuation of the darker style exhibited on Potpourri, and the arguably the heaviest of any P-Model outing. Bandleader Susumu Hirasawa shouts his vocals to the backdrop of loud drums and bass, instruments randomly cut in and out, guitar parts are sinister. The compositions are simple and lyrics abstract.

Hirasawa focused on sound, insisting on natural reverb instead of digital reverb, and so recording the drum parts on the landing of a stairwell in the building where the album's studio was located. This method led to complications and constant fighting between P-Model and the recording engineer, who insisted on using digital reverb. In the end, it was settled without the engineer and all recording was made Hirasawa's way.

== Track listing ==
All tracks are written by Susumu Hirasawa, except where noted.

No.	Title	Lyrics	Music	Length
1.	"Heaven"			3:27
2.	"Train" (列車 Ressha)			2:33
3.	"Zombi"			4:00
4.	"Coelacanth" (Misspelled as "Coelacance" on album sleeve)	Hirasawa, Yasumi Tanaka	Tanaka	3:53
5.	"A Large Snake" (うわばみ Uwabami)			2:51
6.	"Perspective"			3:02
7.	"Solid Air"		Hirasawa, Tanaka	4:04
8.	"Be in a Fix" (のこりギリギリ Nokori Girigiri)			4:48
9.	"Perspective II"			3:58

== Perspective II ==
Perspective II

Remix album by P-Model
- Released: May 1, 1982
- Studios: Sunrise Studio, Ikebukuro, Toshima, Tokyo
- Genres: Post-punk; industrial rock; no wave; experimental
- Length: 38:49
- Labels: Tokuma, Japan
- Producer: P-Model

P-Model live/rearrange chronology
Perspective II (1982)	SCUBA (CD) (1989)

Perspective II is an alternate version of Perspective originally released exclusively on Compact Cassette, a first for the group. While it has no drastic changes from Perspective, Perspective II has a different mix and two new instrumentals. Some of the new material features the use of a drum machine, which is completely absent from Perspective.

=== Track listing ===
All tracks are written by Susumu Hirasawa, except where noted.

No.	Title	Lyrics	Music	Length
1.	"Heaven"			3:31
2.	"Train" (列車 Ressha)			2:41
3.	"Zombi"			4:13
4.	"Coelacanth" (Misspelled as "Coelacance" on some album text)	Hirasawa, Yasumi Tanaka	Tanaka	4:02
5.	"A Large Snake" (うわばみ Uwabami)			2:55
6.	"Mercator"	instrumental		2:03
7.	"Perspective"			3:06
8.	"Solid Air"		Hirasawa, Tanaka	4:15
9.	"Be in a Fix" (のこりギリギリ Nokori Girigiri)			5:06
10.	"Perspective II"			3:58
11.	"Blümcale"	instrumental		2:57

== Personnel ==
P-Model – production, arrangements

- Susumu Hirasawa – vocals, guitar, synthesizer, drum machine
- Yasumi Tanaka – keyboards
- Sadatoshi Tainaka – drums
- Tatsuya Kikuchi – bass

Staff

- Shōzō Shiba – direction
- Akira "Pokari" Sasaki – recording, mixing
- Mamoru "Ponta II" Ishitashi and Shōji Nakano – assistant engineers
- Yūichi Hirasawa (credited as "Y. Hirasawa") – art director
- Api Yomiya – photography
- Model House – productive management

== Release history ==
Date	Label(s)	Format	Catalog	Album	Notes
March 1, 1982	Tokuma Japan Corporation, Japan Record	LP	JAL-19	Perspective	Resold by Vivid Sound circa 1987, only difference is the catalogue number (PRL-1016) and a slightly different obi.
March 1, 1982	Tokuma Japan Corporation, Japan Record	CS	28J-17	Perspective II	Resold by Vivid Sound with the catalogue number PRC-1092.
June 25, 1989	Tokuma Japan Corporation, WAX Records	CD	27WXD-119	Perspective	Released alongside Another Game.
August 25, 1991	Tokuma Japan Corporation, WAX Records	CD	TKCA-30335	Perspective II	Due to dimensional differences between formats, this release's art is near identical to that of Perspective's.
September 25, 1994	Tokuma Japan Communications, WAX Records	CD	TKCA-70479	Perspective	Released alongside Another Game. Part of the "Quality Music" series of budget reissues. Packaged in a slimline case and priced at 1500 yen.
May 10, 2002; July 4, 2014	Chaos Union, Teslakite	CD	CHTE-0007	Perspective & Perspective II	Remastered by Hirasawa. Disc 3 of the Ashu-on [Sound Subspecies] in the solar system box set. Re-released with new packaging by Kiyoshi Inagaki.
April 25, 2007	Tokuma Japan Communications, sky station, SS RECORDINGS	CD	SS-902	Perspective & Perspective II (titled Perspective +11 Tracks)	Remastered (digitally, 24 bit). Packaged in a paper sleeve to replicate the original LP packaging. Includes new liner notes by music industry writer Dai Onojima.
July 17, 2015	Tokuma Japan Communications, WAX Records	SHM-CD	TKCA-10133	Perspective	Released alongside Another Game. Remastered, limited release. Packaged in a paper sleeve to replicate the original LP packaging.

- "Heaven" is included on the rebel incorporated various artists compilation.
- "Perspective" is included on the J-ROCK 80'S various artists compilation.
- "Train" (Perspective II version) is included on the GROOVIN' Shōwa! 7～Romantist various artists compilation.

== See also ==
- 1982 in Japanese music
