= Uchoten =

Uchōten
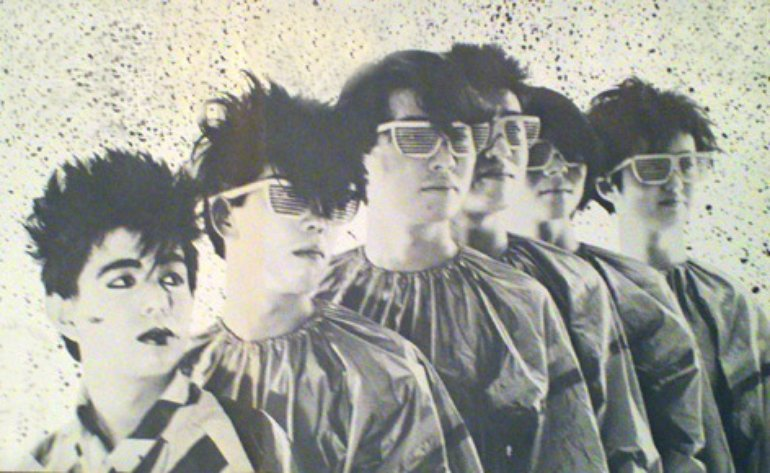
- Uchoten, mid 1985 (From left to right) Kera, Cou, Tabo, Kubobryu, Zin, and Eriko.

Background information
- Origin: Tokyo, Japan
- Genres: Experimental/new wave/post punk
- Years active: 1982–1991, 2015-present

Uchōten (有頂天 ecstasy) is a Japanese experimental new wave/post punk band, active in the 1980s and early 1990s. They formed in 1982 and disbanded in 1991, after releasing eight studio albums and two live albums. In 2015, after over two decades apart, Uchoten reunited.

== History ==
Uchoten formed in Tokyo, Japan from the band Densenbyou. Densenbyou's last concert and Uchoten's first concert were both on 6 April 1982. They are led by vocalist Kera.

Uchoten released their first album and singles on Kera's independent record label, Nagomu. In 1985, they released Kokoro no tabi on a bigger indie label, Captain, a cover of a popular Japanese song from 1973 performed by Tulip. Uchoten, The Willard and Laughin' Nose were referred to as the Indies Big Three.

In September 1986 they released their major debut album, Peace. Peace has a theme of ending and death, and because of this some fans worried that Uchoten were going to break up, however they lasted five more years with several lineup changes.

Uchoten initially played their last concert on 15 September 1991, a recording of which was later released on a CD titled Search For 1/3 Fin, until reforming in 2015 after 24 years disbanded.

Throughout their career, Uchoten has performed a number of covers, of artists including King Crimson, Gilbert O'Sullivan, Lizard, P-Model and Takuro Yoshida.

== Lineups ==
1. April 1982 - September 1982
  - Kera - Vocals
  - Toshi - Guitar
  - Tabo - Guitar
  - Chachamaru - Bass
  - Mika - Bass
  - Eriko - Keyboard
  - Zin - Percussion
  - Minosuke - Drums
2. September 1982 - May 1984
  - Kera - Vocals
  - Toshi - Guitar
  - Tabo - Guitar
  - Chachamaru - Bass
  - Eriko - Keyboard
  - Zin - Drums
3. July 1984 - May 1985
  - Kera - Vocals
  - Toshi - Guitar
  - Tabo - Guitar
  - Kubobryu - Bass
  - Eriko - Keyboards
  - Zin - Drums
4. June 1985 - February 1986
  - Kera - Vocals
  - Huckai - Guitar
  - Cou - Guitar
  - Kubobryu - Bass
  - Charity - Keyboard
  - Zin - Drums
5. February 1986 - February 1988
  - Kera - Vocals
  - Huckai - Guitar
  - Cou - Guitar
  - Kubobryu - Bass
  - Myue - Keyboard
  - Zin - Drums
6. March 1988 - May 1989
  - Kera - Vocals
  - Huckai - Guitar
  - Cou - Guitar
  - Kubobryu - Bass
  - Shiu - Keyboard
  - Zin - Drums
7. May 1989 - September 1991
  - Kera - Vocals
  - Cou - Guitar
  - Kubobryu - Bass
  - Shiu - Keyboard
  - Zin - Drums

== Discography ==
- Dohyou ouji (1983)
- Because (1986)
- Peace (1986)
- Vegetable Demo (1987)
- Aissle (1987)
- Search For 1/3 Boil (1988) Live album
- Gan (1988)
- Search For 1/3 Stop! Hand In Hand (1989)
- Colorful Merry ga futta machi (1990)
- Dekkachi (1990)
- Search For 1/3 Fin (1991) Live album
- 1984-1987 Vegetable (1992) Best-of
- Lost and Found (2015)
- Kafka's Rock/Nietzsche's Pop (2016)
