= In a Model Room =

Studio album by P-Model
- Released: August 25, 1979
- Recorded: May – June 1979
- Studios: various: Sunrise Studio (recording and remixing), Ikebukuro, Toshima; Freedom Studio, Ōkubo, Shinjuku; Electro Sound, Akihabara, Chiyoda; Tokyo
- Genres: New wave; synthpop
- Length: 33:28
- Languages: Japanese, English
- Label: Warner-Pioneer
- Producers: Masahide Sakuma; P-Model

P-Model chronology
Air on the Wiring (1978)	In a Model Room (1979)	Landsale (1980)

Singles from In a Model Room
- 1. "Art Mania" c/w "Sunshine City" Released: July 25, 1979 K-17W; 2. "Kameari Pop" c/w "Health Angel" Released: December 25, 1979 K-23W

In a Model Room is the debut album of Japanese band P-Model. It was an electronic pop album, released in 1979 under the label, Warner Bros.

== Background ==
By 1978, Susumu Hirasawa, guitarist and vocalist of Mandrake, one of the few Japanese progressive metal bands at the time, was unsatisfied with the style the band worked in, feeling that progressive rock had lost its social relevance and became solely for entertainment. By then, Mandrake's only achievements were a devoted but extremely niche following by fans of Japanese progressive rock fans (who, by Hirasawa's estimate, totaled at only a few hundred people), and bit parts on releases by an all-synth band they'd befriended.

Around this time, the punk rock/new wave movements started in the west; experiencing these new forms of presenting concepts and visuals through music via promotional videos; most of the band went through a drastic change in outlook towards music, and started to write songs and gradually change their look accordingly.

Mandrake had turned into a half-hearted band and, after declining an offer to sign with Victor Music Industries, Hirasawa decided to "abort" Mandrake, characterizing it as the defeat to commercialism. The band's final live performance was a three-hour show at the Shibuya Jean-Jean, meant to be the symbolic burial of Mandrake's aborted body.

On New Year's Day 1979, the members of the band held a meeting to decide how they would reform. Bassist Tohru Akutu, still attached to progressive rock, decided to depart from the band. The instruments which "emitted a pretentious grandeur" (most of them painted in dignified colors like purple, gold and burgundy) were either repainted in bright colors (like yellow, light blue and pink) or sold off to buy ones more adequate for what the band envisioned. It was decided that their name would be changed to something that evoked the new development of a mass-produced industrial good.

== Composition and Production ==
Most of the songs on the album were created by Mandrake late in the group's existence, which allowed for a quick debut release. The songs show a tendency for complex compositions and unusual time signatures. The lyrics reflect on the sociopolitical issues of Japan at the time, during the Japanese post-war economic miracle, and were influenced in part by Nineteen Eighty-Four.

In a Model Room was produced by Masahide Sakuma, keyboardist of the new wave band Plastics with studio experience from being in the progressive rock band Yonin-Bayashi, who agreed to do so on the strength of the album's first track. Described by Hirasawa as "an honest man who acted with a life-sized air of cleanliness", Sakuma was swiftly trusted by the band, who were cautious with making their debut. Producing for the first time outside of his band, Sakuma went on to become a renowned session producer.

The instrumentation is a mix of standard punk with electronic devices for mechanical tones: A Roland CR-68 drum machine does simultaneous beats alongside a standard drum kit; the Maxi-Korg 800DV synthesizer was used for a unique blipping noise, dubbed by the music press as a "musical stapler". P-Model came to argue with Warner-Pioneer, Sakuma and engineer Makoto Furukawa daily over their instruments: The band picked them because they felt a rough sound was crucial to their theme, the production thought it all sounded bad. Ultimately, P-Model compromised on most aspects of the recording.

Hirasawa re-recorded the album (with the exception of "Sophisticated") in 1999 as Virtual Live-1 [P-Model Live at Roppongi S-Ken Studio 1979].

== Legacy ==
In 2007 Rolling Stone Japan ranked it at number 52 in its list of the 100 Greatest Japanese Rock Albums of All Time and Snoozer ranked it at number 125 in its list of the 150 Greatest Albums of Japanese Rock 'n' Roll. Polysics covered "The Great Brain" for the 2007 album Karate House and have performed "Art Mania" live. A cover of "Art Mania" using Kagamine Rin is included on the Hatsune Miku sings NEW WAVE cover album.

== Track listing ==
All tracks are written by Susumu Hirasawa, except where noted.

No.	Title	Lyrics	Music	Length
1.	"Art Mania" (美術館で会った人だろ Bijutsukan de Atta Hito Daro, Surely I Met You at the Art Museum)			3:09
2.	"Health Angel" (ヘルス・エンジェル Herusu Engeru)	Yasumi Tanaka	Tanaka	2:32
3.	"Roomrunner" (ルームランナー Rūmurannā, Treadmill)	Tanaka	Tanaka	2:32
4.	"Sophisticated" (ソフィスティケイテッド Sofisutikeiteddo)			4:26
5.	"For Kids" (子供たちどうも Kodomotachi Dōmo)	Yūichi Hirasawa		3:31
6.	"Kameari Pop"			3:56
7.	"Sunshine City" (サンシャイン・シティー Sanshain Shitī)	Y. Hirasawa	Tanaka	2:03
8.	"The Great Brain" (偉大なる頭脳 Idainaru Zunō)		Fumiyasu Abe (uncredited), S. Hirasawa	2:03
9.	"White Cigarettes" (ホワイト・シガレット Howaito Shigaretto)			3:15
10.	"Pinky Trick" (MOMO色トリック MOMO Iro Torikku)			3:18
11.	"Art Blind" (アート・ブラインド Āto Buraindo)			2:39

The figure of "Art Mania" is a modification of a phrase from the 1952 Poly e Seus Modernistas song "Turista" (written by Ângelo Apolônio), based on a 1963 cover by The Atlantics. "The Great Brain" is a reworking of a section of the 1973 Mandrake song Deranged Door (錯乱の扉, Sakuran no Tobira) (officially unreleased at the time, credited to Fumiyasu Abe when released on 1997's Unreleased Materials vol. 1). "White Cigarettes" contains an interpolation of the Arabian riff (believed to originate from a 17th century traditional Algerian song, published as part of various other compositions by various other musicians over time).

Two other songs were considered for the album: The Hirasawa-penned "Alien" (異邦人, Ihōjin) and the Tanaka piece "White Shoes" (ホワイト・シューズ, Howaito Shuuzu). The former, at times part of Mandrake setlists, was considered too heavy and "not the sound you want out of a pink album"; it was later recorded, with new parts by Tanaka, for Landsale. The latter was first publicly released as BGM for the end credits of the Photon-1 video in 1989.

== Personnel ==
P-Model - Production, Arrangements

- Susumu Hirasawa - Vocals, Guitar, Synthesizer, Jacket Design
- Yasumi Tanaka - Combo organ, Synthesizers, Sequencer, Backing vocals
- Sadatoshi Tainaka - Drums, Drum machine
- Katsuhiko Akiyama - Bass, Synthesizer, Backing vocals

Staff

- Masahide Sakuma - "Switchist", Production
- Tomonari Sassa - Direction
- Makoto Furukawa - Engineering, Mixing
- Kozo Kenmochi, Kenji Konno & Ryuichi Suzuki - Assistant Engineering
- Yūichi Hirasawa - Lyrics, Art director
- Hideki Namai - Photography
- Special Thanks to: Hisaaki Katoh, Nobumasa Uchida, Yūichi Hirasawa, Hiroshi Yamamoto, Daiji Okai, Sunshine City Gals, Ms. Shirota

== Release history ==
Date	Label(s)	Format	Catalog	Notes
August 25, 1979	Warner-Pioneer	LP	K-10017W	First limited print run was pressed on clear pink vinyl. The center labels refer to the sides of the record as "Models".
August 25, 1979	Warner-Pioneer	CS	LKF-5029	
January 25, 1992	Warner Music Japan	CD	WPCL-603	Released (alongside Landsale and Potpourri) a month before the release of P-Model.
May 10, 2002; July 4, 2014	Chaos Union, Teslakite	CD	CHTE-0005	Remastered by Hirasawa. Part of Disc 1 of the Ashu-on [Sound Subspecies] in the solar system box set, alongside Landsale. The demo and "White Shoes" are on Disc 13 (CHTE-0017). Re-released with new packaging by Kiyoshi Inagaki.
October 20, 2003	Warner Music Japan, sky station, SS RECORDINGS	CD	SS-101	Packaged in a paper sleeve to replicate the original LP packaging. Includes new liner notes by music industry writer Dai Onojima.

- "Roomrunner" is included on the GET THE PUNK -J PUNK & NEW WAVE 1972～1991- various artists compilation.
- "Art Mania" is included on the ROCK is LOFT -Purple Disc- ～SHINJUKU LOFT 30th Anniversary～, TECHNOLOID -JAPANESE 80's NEW WAVE SAMPLER-, Rock NIPPON～Selected by Hiroshi Tsuchiya, KING SONGS of NEW WAVE and SAKUMA DROPS compilation albums.
- The album's singles were reissued on CD on paper sleeves to replicate their original packaging with the band's other Warner-Pioneer released singles as part of the Tower Records exclusive Warner Years Singles Box box set in 2012.

== See also ==
- 1979 in Japanese music
