= P-Model =

Japanese rock band

- Also known as: Ikari; Heaven; Karkador; The Mortal World's Paradise Kameari Eternal One Pattern Band; Kameari Towers
- Origin: Kameari, Katsushika, Tokyo, Japan
- Genres: Electronic rock; experimental rock; ambient; electro-pop; new-age; new wave; synth-pop
- Years active: 1979–1988 ･ 1991–1993 ･ 1994-2000
- Labels: Warner-Pioneer (1979–1981); Tokuma/Japan (1982–1984); Alfa/EDGE (1985–1986); Polydor K.K. (1992–1993); DIW/SYUN (1994–1995); Nippon Columbia (1995–1997); Teslakite (1996–present); biosphere/Magnet (1999); Chaos Union (1997–present)
- Spinoff of: Mandrake
- Members: Susumu Hirasawa

P-Model (also typeset as P-MODEL and P. Model) was a Japanese electronic rock band started in 1979 by members of the defunct progressive rock band Mandrake. The band has experienced many lineup revisions over the years but frontman Susumu Hirasawa was always at the helm of operations. P-Model officially disbanded in 2000, although many of its members continue to release solo albums and collaborate with each other on different projects.

Hirasawa has since released work under the name "Kaku P-Model" (核P-Model; lit. 'nucleus of P-Model'), effectively a solo revival of the band.

== Members ==
- Susumu Hirasawa (平沢 進) – guitar, vocals, synthesizer, Miburi, Heavenizer, Graviton, Amiga, programming (1 January 1979 – 20 December 2000; 2004–2005, 2013–2014, 2018, 2025 as KAKU P-MODEL)

=== Former members ===
- Yasumi Tanaka (田中 靖美) – bass, combo organ, synthesizer, keyboard (1 January 1979 – 20 March 1983; 2013 Kaku P-Model guest appearance)
- Sadatoshi Tainaka (田井中 貞利) – drums, cymbals, percussion, electronic drums, drum machine (1 January 1979 – 22 December 1984; 14 March 1987 – 28 December 1988 PART2)
- Katsuhiko Akiyama (秋山 勝彦) – bass, vocals, keyboard, synthesizer, Tubular Hertz (1 January 1979 – 3 November 1980; 23 September 1991 – 11 October 1993)
- Tatsuya Kikuchi (菊池 達也) – bass, synthesizer (21 November 1980 – 5 August 1984)
- Shunichi Miura (三浦 俊一) – keyboard, guitar, vocals (27 March 1983 – 27 December 1985)
- Tadahiko Yokogawa (横川 理彦(タダヒコ)) – bass, electric violin, double bass, ocarinas (bass, tenor and soprano), synthesizer, MSX, vocals (28 August 1984 – 27 December 1985)
- Yasuhiro Araki (荒木 康弘) – drums, cymbals, percussion, electronic drums (22 December 1984 – 14 March 1987)
- Teruo Nakano (中野 照夫(テルヲ)) – bass (fretted and fretless), keyboard, vocals (23 January 1986 – 28 December 1988)
- Yoshikazu Takahashi (高橋 芳一) – Systems (23 January 1986 – 27 September 1987)
- Hikaru Kotobuki (ことぶき 光) – keyboard, synthesizer, vocals, Compact Macintosh, programming (1 November 1987 – 28 December 1988; 23 September 1991 – 11 October 1993)
- Yasuchika Fujii (藤井 康親(ヤスチカ)) – electronic drums, cymbals (23 September 1991 – 11 October 1993)
- Hajime Fukuma (福間 創) – System-1 (1 December 1994 – 20 December 2000; 11 – 14 January 2014 KAKU P-MODEL guest appearance)
- Kenji Konishi (小西 健司) – System-2, bass (1 December 1994 – 20 December 2000)
- Wataru Kamiryo (上領 亘) – AlgoRhythm (1 December 1994 – 15 May 1997)
- Tainaco – Virtual drums (21 October 1997 – 20 December 2000)
  - Amiga program operated through MIDI signals; three types, 1, 2 and E (enhanced) were created. CG model based on drummer Sadatoshi Tainaka, later replaced with photos of Tainaka. Never reappeared after 2000.

== Discography ==
=== Studio albums ===
Title	Release details
In a Model Room	Released: 25 August 1979; Label: Warner-Pioneer; Formats: LP, CS
Landsale	Released: 24 April 1980; Label: Warner-Pioneer; Formats: LP, CS
Potpourri	Released: 25 April 1981; Label: Warner-Pioneer; Formats: LP, CS
Perspective	Released: 1 March 1982; Label: Tokuma Japan Corporation, Japan Record; Formats: LP
Unauthorized Music Collection vol.1 (不許可曲集 vol.1, Fu Kyoka Kyoku Shū vol.1)	Released: 25 March 1983; Label: Model House; Formats: CS
Another Game	Released: 25 February 1984; Label: Tokuma Japan Corporation, Japan Record; Formats: LP
Scuba	Released: 10 December 1984; Label: JICC Publishing Bureau; Formats: Cassette Book
Karkador	Released: 25 December 1985; Label: Alfa Records, EDGE Records; Formats: LP
One Pattern	Released: 25 June 1986 25 July 1986 (CD); Label: Alfa Records, EDGE Records; Formats: LP, CD
P-Model	Released: 26 February 1992; Label: Polydor K.K.; Formats: CD
Big Body	Released: 25 March 1993; Label: Polydor K.K.; Formats: CD
Fune (舟; Ship)	Released: 9 December 1995; Label: Nippon Columbia, Teslakite; Formats: CD
Electronic Tragedy/〜Enola (電子悲劇/〜Enola, Denshi Higeki/〜Enola)	Released: 29 November 1997; Label: Nippon Columbia, Teslakite; Formats: enhanced CD
Music Industrial Wastes〜P-Model or Die (音楽産業廃棄物〜P-Model or Die, Ongaku Sangyō Haiki Butsu〜P-Model or Die)	Released: 1 September 1999 (MP3) 22 September 1999 (CD); Label: Chaos Union, Teslakite(MP3) Magnet Records, Teslakite(CD); Formats: MP3, CD

=== Live and Remix-Remake albums ===
Title	Release details
Perspective II	Released: 1 May 1982; Label: Tokuma Japan Corporation, Japan Record; Formats: CS CD (Reissues)
Unauthorized Music Collection (不許可曲集, Fu Kyoka Kyoku Shū)	Released: 1988; Label: Model House; Formats: CS
SCUBA (1989 CD re-issue)	Released: 21 January 1989; Label: captain Records; Formats: CD
Pause	Released: 25 May 1994; Label: DIW, SYUN; Formats: CD
The Way of Live (Live の方法, Live no Hōhō)	Released: 23 July 1994; Label: DIW, SYUN; Formats: CD
Corrective Errors〜re-mix of Fune (Corrective Errors〜re-mix of 舟)	Released: 30 September 1995; Label: DIW, SYUN; Formats: CD
Scuba Recycle	Released: 30 November 1995; Label: DIW, SYUN; Formats: CD
Unauthorized Music Collection from 1983 (不許可曲集 from 1983, Fu Kyoka Kyoku Shū from 1983)	Released: 21 October 1998; Label: Green Nerve; Formats: CD
Virtual Live-1 [P-Model Live at Roppongi S-Ken Studio 1979]	Released: 6 July 1999 (MP3) 25 August 1999 (CD); Label: Chaos Union, Teslakite (MP3) Magnet Records, Teslakite (CD); Formats: MP3 CD
Virtual Live-2 [P-Model Live at Shibuya Nylon 100% 1980]	Released: 25 October 1999 (MP3) 25 November 1999 (CD); Label: Chaos Union, Teslakite (MP3) Magnet Records, Teslakite (CD); Formats: MP3 CD
Virtual Live-3 [P-Model Live at Kyodai Seibu Kodo 1982]	Released: 25 November 1999 (MP3) 15 December 1999 (CD); Label: Chaos Union, Teslakite (MP3) Magnet Records, Tslakite (CD); Formats: MP3 CD

=== Compilations ===
- P-Plant CD Vol. 1, 2000
- Ashu-on [Sound Subspecies] in the solar system (太陽系亞種音, Taiyōkei Ashu-on), 2002
- Golden☆Best, 2004
- P-Model Warner Years Singles Box, 2012

=== Singles ===
- "Art Mania", 1979
- "Kameari Pop", 1979
- "Missile", 1980
- "junglebed II", 1981
- "Index P-0", 1983
- "Solid Air Dance Version", 1983
- "Ikari", 1984
- "Re;", 1985
- "P-Model Another Act 6", 1985
- "Another Day", 1986
- "Opening SE 1992", 1992
- "demo", 1994
- "SAKSIT North Passage MIX, 1996
- ">>>Unfix One>>> *Rocket Shoot*", 1996
- ">>>Unfix Eight>>> *Ashura Clock*", 1997
- ">>>Unfix Nine>>> *Layer-Green*", 1997

=== Other releases ===
- Model House Works, 1985
- "Leak"/"Birds", 1986
- "Pre Drums", 1986
- Zebra Cassette (Zebraカセット, Zebra Kasetto), 1986
- Christmas Song, 1986
- "SSS-Star Eyes", 1987
- "entro Pack", 1987
- "Legend of Sadatoshi Tainaka", 1987
- Cassette's Bravo!, 1988
- Shut Up'N'Hit Your Stage', 1988
- Music Industrial Wastes〜P-Model or Die Samples, 1999
- Virtual Live Samples, 1999
- Dekikake, 1999
- "Moon Plant-I (full)", 1999
- "Astro-Ho (narration Version)", 1999
- "Falling Rain (P-Model version)", 1999
- "Illegal Dumping" (不法投棄, Fuhōtōki), 1999
- Global Tribute Battle, 2000
- "Phase-7", 2000

=== Videography ===
- Moire Vision, 1988
- Sankai no Jintai Chizu (三界の人体地図), 1988
- Bitmap 1979–1992, 1992
- Ending Error, 1996
- Non-Locality Live Video (非局所性LIVEビデオ), 1997
- Live Video "Music Industrial Wastes〜P-Model or Die", 2000

=== Music Videos ===
All videos from the Great Brain to Harm Harmonizer were directed by Yuichi "You1" Hirasawa (Susumu's brother). "Fu-Ru-He-He-He", "2D or Not 2D" and "Grid" were included in "Bitmap 1979–1992"; "Monotone Grid" was included in "Photon-3"; "http" was included in "Rocket Shoot"; "Logic Airforce" was included in "Live Video Music Industrial Wastes〜P-Model or Die".

- "The Great Brain", 1979
- "I Am Your Only Model", 1980
- "different≠another", 1981
- "potpourri", 1981
- "natural", 1981
- "disgusting telephone", 1981
- "Heaven", 1982
- "Perspective", 1982
- "Be in a Fix", 1982
- "Hoka No Keikaku", 1983
- "Echoes", 1983
- "Fu-Ru-He-He-He", 1983
- "Atom-Siberia", 1984
- "Harm Harmonize"r, 1984
- "Karkador", 1986
- "Another Day", 1986
- "2D or Not 2D", 1992
- "Grid", 1992
- Monotone Grid", 1994
- Power to Dream", 1995
- "http", 1996
- "Ashura Clock (Discommunicator)", 1997
- "Logic Airforce", 1999

== Legacy ==
P-Model, as well Susumu Hirasawa through his solo career, have been influential both on musicians, as well as on artists that work on other mediums, with a reputation for having many fans in the manga and anime industries. Their creative collaborators (and even 6 of the band's members) often started out as big fans of and directly influenced by their work: Berserk mangaka Kentaro Miura has found that listening to Hirasawa's songs has helped him regain focus on the themes of his writing multiple times, mangaka/anime director Satoshi Kon wrote that Hirasawa's work was "a source of imagination and creativity for me" over the last 20 years of his life, film director Daihachi Yoshida considers Hirasawa as the creator of "about half of my way of thinking".

Beyond associates, P-Model and/or Hirasawa have been cited as influences by musicians such as Fukusuke of Metronome, Hiroyuki Hayashi of Polysics, Daoko (whose song "Welcome to the Parade", from 2012's HyperGirl: Mukōgawa no Onna no Ko, was directly influenced by Hirasawa's worldview), Toby Driver of Kayo Dot (who claims the album Plastic House on Base of Sky was an attempt to "make [his] version of [Hirasawa's] music") and Kenshi Yonezu (who has said that a Hirasawa song "changed [his] life").

Other artists that have expressed adoration for their work include Klaha of Malice Mizer, Shiroi Heya no Futari mangaka Ryoko Yamagishi, Arika Takarano of Ali Project, Roujin Z/JoJo's Bizarre Adventure director Hiroyuki Kitakubo, voice actress/singer Sumire Uesaka, musician/actor Gen Hoshino, Hellsing mangaka Kouta Hirano, Demon Slayer: Kimetsu no Yaiba mangaka Koyoharu Gotouge, Fullmetal Alchemist/Concrete Revolutio director Seiji Mizushima, Fate/stay night [Réalta Nua]/Taiko no Tatsujin composer Satoshi "hil" Ishikawa and actress/singer Ko Shibasaki.

The five main characters of the K-On! franchise (Yui Hirasawa, Mio Akiyama, Ritsu Tainaka, Tsumugi Kotobuki and Azusa Nakano) are in a band, share the surnames of late '80s P-Model members and play their respective primary instrument (save for Nakano). All referenced members who are still active have acknowledged the connection. Besides that, P-Model references can also be found on the manga The Sorrow of a Perfectly Healthy Girl and Opus; as well the anime Sailor Moon, Perfect Blue, BECK: Mongolian Chop Squad and Space Dandy. In the world of theatre, musician/playwright Keralino Sandorovich named 2 of his stage plays (Frozen Beach and Blue Cross) after P-Model songs and 1 (Haldyn Hotel) after a Hirasawa solo song.
