= Hikaru Kotobuki =

Japanese musician (born 1964)

Hikaru Kotobuki (ことぶき 光, Kotobuki Hikaru; born 1964) is a Japanese musician known for his work with Susumu Hirasawa (P-Model), and Jun Togawa.

In the early 1980s, Kotobuki joined Morio Agata's tour as a keyboard player and guitarist. After Agata's tour, Kotobuki and Agata formed a band which they called the Yukiyama Brothers. During his time with the Yukiyama Brothers, he played the keyboard on Shigeru Izumiya's tour.

Kotobuki joined the band P-Model in 1987, which was formed by Susumu Hirasawa. In his time with P-Model, he played the keyboard as well. Hikaru Kotobuki played many concerts and released music videos with P-Model. Unfortunately recordings from this time only survive as live video sound sources. The band took a four-year break, but came back together in 1991 under the name Thaw P-Model.

Kotobuki resigned in 1993 in order to travel through Asia, which he eventually did for several years. Returning briefly from Cambodia in late 1993 he formed Phnonpenh MODEL, in order to join the Errors of P-Mania cover band contest - a contest for P-Model cover bands held for three years. Originally formed as a joke, the band has continued sporadically to this day and have released three studio albums and live CDs from their shows in Paris, Berlin and Tokyo. Key members are Hikaru Kotobuki, Lion Merry (ex-Yapoos and Metrofarce) and Masaaki Taniguchi.

He also performs as a solo act with a backing band.

In 2016 Kotobuki was involved in a memorial concert for Isao Tomita, where a live orchestra was blended with the synthetic performer Hatsune Miku to perform Tomita's work. Kotobuki had previously worked with Tomita on his 2012 Ihatov Symphony, which was the work performed at the memorial concert.

== Discography ==
As Phnonpehn Model

- Errors of P-MANIA! (1993, HIRASAWA BYPASS, various artists release)
- Desk Top Hard Lock (1994, DIW/SYUN, as "Kotobuki Hikaru with Phnonpenh MODEL")
- PATCHWORKS (1998, Club Lunatica/Captain Trip Records)
- THE LAST FAMOUS INTERNATIONAL GLUTTONS (1998, Snowdonia, various artists release)
- melting high/berlin～paris～tokyo (1999, Club Lunatica)
- SHINONOME (東雲 (しののめ)) (2000, Club Lunatica)
- General Midge (2007, IRQ, inc.)
