= Klaha =

- Promotional photograph of Klaha in Malice Mizer (2001)

Background information
- Born: Haruna Masaki (春名 真樹, Masaki Haruna); May 3 Osaka, Japan
- Genres: Dark wave; gothic rock; pop rock; new wave
- Occupations: Musician; singer-songwriter
- Instruments: Vocals; keyboards
- Years active: 1992–2004
- Formerly of: Pride of Mind; Malice Mizer
- Website: klahainfo.com

Masaki Haruna (Japanese: 春名 真樹, Hepburn: Haruna Masaki; born May 3), better known as Klaha, is a Japanese former singer-songwriter. He is best known as third vocalist of the visual kei rock band Malice Mizer from 2000 to 2001. He was previously in the 1990s new wave band Pride of Mind, and started a solo career after leaving Malice Mizer.

== Early life ==
Haruna was born on May 3 in Osaka, Kansai, Japan. In his early life, he was interested in classical music, opera, and chansons. He enjoyed the works of classical composers like Frédéric Chopin and Pyotr Ilyich Tchaikovsky.

== Career ==
=== 1992–1996: Pride of Mind ===
Haruna started his musical career in the late 1980s or early 1990s as a keyboardist. Around this time, he gained a liking for artists such as Pet Shop Boys, Depeche Mode, and Susumu Hirasawa. In February or September 1992, along with one of his former band members, Atsushi Fukuyama, he co-founded a new wave band named Pride of Mind. Haruna was the vocalist and lyricist of the band. He left Pride of Mind in 1996 with no intention to continue his musical career in the future. Haruna's only full-length album with Pride of Mind was Systems of Romance. Following his departure from the band, he modeled in at least one advertisement for a secondhand fashion shop.

=== 2000–2001: Malice Mizer ===
Four years after Haruna's departure from Pride of Mind, in 2000, his friend Yu~ki, the bassist of Malice Mizer, invited him to provide vocals for the band's upcoming album, Bara no Seidou. Haruna adopted the name "Klaha" as his artistic pseudonym. His first release with the band was the "Shiroi Hada ni Kurū Ai to Kanashimi no Rondo" single. The Bara no Seidou album was released on August 23, 2000. Klaha remained a session vocalist until Malice Mizer's live at the Nippon Budokan in September 2000, when he became an official member of the band.

In 2001, along with his fellow members of Malice Mizer, Klaha starred in a feature-length vampire movie Bara no Konrei (Mayonaka ni Kawashita Yakusoku). The band released three singles featuring Klaha as the vocalist: "Gardenia", "Beast of Blood", and "Garnet ~Kindan no Sono e~". Malice Mizer disbanded in December 2001.

=== 2002–2004: Solo career ===
Following Malice Mizer's disbandment, Klaha decided to start a solo career. He drastically changed his image, dropping Malice Mizer's gothic aesthetic and sound in favor of light, sentimental pop music, and billing himself as a "pop artist".

In December 2002, he released a full-length album titled Nostal Lab, followed by the single "Märchen" in 2003. Both of those releases were accompanied by live tours. In 2004, he released an EP titled "Setsubou".

After a live appearance in April 2004, Klaha's releases and performances stopped without explanation. His official website was shut down in 2009. It is presumed he permanently retired from public life. The musical rights to his solo work are partially managed by S4MG, which released his "Märchen" single on digital platforms in 2017. Malice Mizer guitarist Mana said he tried contacting Klaha in regards to him participating in the band's 25th anniversary concerts in September 2018, but received no response.

== Discography ==
=== Solo ===
- Nostal Lab - album (December 4, 2002)
1. "Shinsho Prism (Instrumental)" (心象プリズム (Instrumental))- 00:55
2. "Scape: With Transparent Wings" - 03:39
3. "Taiyō no Ori" (太陽の檻) - 05:32
4. "Red Room: Garasu no Hana Red Room" (Red Room ~硝子の花~) - 03:45
5. "Penguin" - 06:13
6. "Kanjou Prism (Instrumental)" - 00:44
7. "Kiseki no Koe" - 05:00
8. "Shokoreito" (ショコレイト) - 04:51
9. "Kamereon no Seppun" (カメレオンの接吻) - 03:43
10. "Sayonara" (サヨナラ) - 05:41
11. "Green: Tsutaetai Omoi" (Green ~伝えたい想い~) - 04:27
12. "Kaihō Prism" (解放プリズム ) - 02:12
- "Märchen" - single (March 26, 2003)
1. "Mitsu (Hisoka) (Instrumental)" (密 (ひそか) (Instrumental)) - 01:05
2. "Märchen" - 04:31
3. "Stay in the Rain" - 04:30
4. "Deatta hi no Mama" (出逢った日のまま) - 04:49
5. "Märchen (Instrumental)" - 04:30
6. "Deatta hi no Mama (Instrumental)" (出逢った日のまま (Instrumental)) - 04:47
- Märchen - VHS/DVD (July 16, 2003)
1. "Mitsu (Hisoka) ~ Märchen"
2. "Stay in the Rain"
  - DVD and VHS have different bonus footage
- Setsubō (切望) - mini-album (February 16, 2004)
1. "Hizashi" (陽射し) - 04:41
2. "Souten Hakugetsu" (蒼天白月) - 05:06
3. "Gekkō: Instrumental" (激昴 ~Instrumental~) - 02:24
4. "Kibou no Tenshi" (希望の天地) - 05:12
5. "Hekiya no Hate" (僻野ノ涯) - 05:23
6. "Gyakkō: Konosaka no Mukōni" (逆光 ~この坂の向こうに~) - 05:19

=== With Pride of Mind ===
- First demo tape (1994)
1. "Dance with Moon" - 04:39
2. "Decayed" - 01:16
3. "Angels of Night" - 03:47
4. "Black Sun" - 03:02
- Promotional demo tape (Unknown Date)
1. "The Sky Was Blue (My Supreme Love) - 07:13
2. "Decayed" - 01:09
3. "Angels of Night" - 03:30
4. "Virulent Red" - 03:39
- Unknown demo tape (Unknown Date)
1. "The Sky Was Blue (My Supreme Love)
2. "Virulent Red"
3. "Dance with Moon"
4. "Decayed"
5. "Angels of Night"
- Second demo tape (1994/5)
1. "The Sky Was Blue" - 07:23
2. "Virulent Red" - 03:39
3. "Hikari no Naka de" (光の中で) - 04:48
4. "Lucent (live version)"
- Image Sonic - various artists compilation (August 29, 1994)
  - "The Sky Was Blue" (track 9)
  - "Hikari no Naka de" (光の中で, track 10)
- Live video tape (November 1, 1995)
  - Recorded on August 29, 1994 at the Shinsaibashi Muse Hall
1. "Intro: Edvard Grieg - In the Hall of the Mountain King (SE)" - 02:55
2. "Salome" - 04:16
3. "Unknown Title" - 03:33
4. "MC" - 00:45
5. "Tale of One Night" - 06:00
6. "The Sky Was Blue" - 07:29
7. "Dance with Moon" - 04:30
8. "Red" -03:48
9. "Angels of Night" 04:13
10. "Outro: The Buggles - I Am A Camera (SE)"
- Systems of Romance - album (November 11, 1995)
1. "Love Light [I Feel Your Breath]" - 04:56
2. "Material World" - 03:36
3. "Walking in My Life" - 03:24
4. "Bright Moments" - 05:21
5. "Flowers" - 04:18
6. "The Sky Was Blue [My Supreme Love]" - 07:24
7. "Red" - 03:49
8. "Out of the Air" - 05:43
9. "Salome [Kikai Shikake no Romansu]" (Salome 機械仕掛のロマンス) - 04:28
10. "The Flower Bloom in the Future" - 04:45

=== With Malice Mizer ===
- "Shiroi Hada ni Kurū Ai to Kanashimi no Rondo" (白い肌に烂う愛と哀しみの輪舞, July 26, 2000)
- Bara no Seidou (薔薇の聖堂, August 23, 2000)
- "Gardenia" (May 30, 2001)
- "Beast of Blood" (June 21, 2001)
- "Mayonaka ni Kawashita Yakusoku: Bara no Konrei" (真夜中に交わした約束 ～薔薇の婚礼～, October 30, 2001)
- "Garnet: Kindan no Sono e" (Garnet ～禁断の園へ～, November 30, 2001)
