= Scuba (album) =

Studio album by P-Model
- Released: September 25, 1984
- Recorded: 1984
- Studios: AC Unit, Akasaka, Minato, Tokyo
- Genres: Cold wave; ambient; electro-pop; new-age; new wave; synth-pop
- Length: 31:35
- Label: JICC Publishing Bureau
- Producer: P-Model

P-Model chronology
| Another Game (1984) | Scuba (1984) | Karkador (1985) |

Alternative cover
- CD release cover

Scuba is an album by the Japanese new wave band P-Model. It is different from other P-Model albums in that it was made almost entirely made by guitarist Susumu Hirasawa alone and for its original issue in the cassette book format: the album was packaged with an 84-page booklet that contained techniques to induce rapid eye movement sleep and hypnosis, the lyric story expanded Scuba Monogatari, photos of the involved band members in a coastal area that illustrated the stories, and an interview with The Stalin vocalist Michiro Endo.

== Overview ==
After the release of P-Model's album Another Game, a process protracted primarily by their then-current label Tokuma Shoten, leader Susumu Hirasawa was exhausted of dealing with major labels, so chose to have the band be independent for some time. In an apartment occupied by friend and former co-worker Akiro Kamio Arishima's (有島 神尾 明朗) film production company AC-Unit, he and a group of friends turned a room into a home studio, and there he and others in various lineups recorded music.

Around the time Hirasawa planned to make something more "proper", he was approached by the JICC Publishing Bureau, makers of WonderLand (宝島, Takarajima; Treasure Island), a subculture-focused magazine that had covered P-Model a number of times beforehand. They asked for the group to make the second entry in their burgeoning cassette book line, which would allow them total freedom from Recording Industry Association of Japan censorship.

Bass and drum parts were handled by Hirasawa with a Korg Polysix and a Korg KPR-77. P-Model's rhythm section was in a state of flux at the time. Manager Mitsuru Hirose (広瀬 充) sought to draw talented personnel to the band. By summer 1984 it had already been decided that Tainaka, who felt he was "at the limit of [his] strength", would leave. Hirose at some point called 4-D/After Dinner member Tadahiko Yokogawa to be the band's new bassist,. then went to current bassist Tatsuya Kikuchi's house to tell him "you are already fired". Tainaka had written one song for the album and Kikuchi recorded basslines for one or two tracks, materials that went unused. The tour for the album featured Tainaka on drums and Yokogawa on bass and other instruments. The promotional photoshoot for Scuba had been done before Kikuchi's dismissal from P-Model, and as such, he was part of the ad campaign for an album he does not appear in, by a band he hadn't been part of for months.

== Track listing ==
All tracks are written by Susumu Hirasawa, except where noted.

| No. | Title | Lyrics | Music | Length |
|---|---|---|---|---|
| 1. | "Frozen Beach" | | | 4:24 |
| 2. | "Boat" | | | 4:16 |
| 3. | "Seven Joint Man" (七節男 Nana Fushi Otoko) | | | 4:11 |
| 4. | "Ohayo II" (オハヨウ II) | | | 4:31 |
| 5. | "Looping Opposition" | Michiro Endo (intro), Hirasawa | | 4:10 |
| 6. | "REM Sleep" | | Hirasawa, Shunichi Miura | 4:31 |
| 7. | "Fish Song" | Hirasawa, Akiro "Kamio" Arishima | Hirasawa, Kamio | 4:39 |
| 8. | "Scuba" | instrumental | | 1:12 |

Endo's segment on "Looping Opposition" is not present on the CD mix of the track, shortening it by 23 seconds. The cassette book version contains sheet music for a "Song of Horohomo" (ホロホモーの歌, Horohomō no Uta), credited to "Furufucchi" (フルフッチ) and sequenced between "Seven Joint Man" and "Ohayo II". No recording of this composition by Hirasawa or anyone involved with the album exists.

== Personnel ==
P-Model – Production, Arrangements

- Susumu Hirasawa – Vocals, Guitar, Synthesizer, Drum machine, Sampler, Programming, book text
- Shunichi Miura – Synthesizers

Additional personnel

- Akemi Tsujitani (AC Unit) – Clothes Construction and Leg, Backing Vocals on "Boat"
- Michiro Endo (The Stalin) – Voice on "Looping Opposition" (cassette book version only)
- Akiro "Kamio" Arishima (AC Unit) – Synthesizer on "Fish Song"
- Mugen Kanzaki (Eco) – Hard Cover Design
- Yumiko Onozawa – Red Clothes Making
- Yasuhiro Ichikawa (Pool) – Photography
- Yūichi Hirasawa (credited as "Yuhichi Hirasawa") – Art director
- Model House – Editorial Coordination
- Mitsuru Hirose – Artist Management
- Special thanks: Kuniharu Kawasaki, Teruo Nakano, Yoshikazu Takahashi, Yuji Matsuda, Kayo Muto

== See also ==
- 1984 in Japanese music
