= P-Model (album) =

Studio album by P-Model
- Released: February 26, 1992
- Studio: Eggs, Oshino, Minamitsuru, Yamanashi; Burnish Stone Studio, Setagaya, Setagaya, Tokyo; Key-Stone Izu Studio, Yawatano, Itō, Shizuoka; Sound Sky Studio, Nakano, Nakano, Tokyo; Den Music Studio; Sonata Club, Omori-Kita, Ōta, Tokyo; Studio Wire Self, Yoyogi, Shibuya, Tokyo; Tokyu Fun Digital Mastering Room (mast.), Dōgenzaka, Shibuya, Tokyo
- Genre: Electronica; industrial
- Length: 38:06
- Label: Polydor K.K.
- Producer: Susumu Hirasawa; Yūichi Kenjo co.)

P-Model chronology
One Pattern (1986)	P-Model (1992)	Big Body (1993)

P-Model is the eighth studio album by P-Model and the first by the "defrosted" lineup.

== Background ==
In the aftermath of the band's hiatus ("freezing") in 1988, P-Model's members went their own separate ways. After releasing three solo albums, frontman Susumu Hirasawa rebuilt the band out of several backing members from his concerts. The new "defrosted" (解凍) lineup comprised pre-hiatus P-Model member Hikaru Kotobuki, returning founding member Katsuhiko Akiyama and associate Yasuchika Fujii.

P-Model officially returned in September 1991.

== Composition ==
On this album, P-Model introduced a machine-like, sci-fi sound to its style, heavily influenced by Amiga computers, which Hirasawa and Kotobuki used for production. This extended to the lyrical themes of the album, being focused on science, technology, and computers.

== Track listing ==
All tracks are written by Susumu Hirasawa, except where noted.

No.	Title	Lyrics	Music	Length
1.	"Speed Tube"			4:00
2.	"2D or Not 2D"	Hirasawa; Hikaru Kotobuki	Hirasawa; Kotobuki	3:17
3.	"Stone Age!"			3:47
4.	"Wire Self"			4:03
5.	"Clear"	Katsuhiko Akiyama	Akiyama	4:32
6.	"Vista"			2:41
7.	"Grid"			2:53
8.	"Lab=01"	Hirasawa; Kotobuki	Hirasawa; Kotobuki	2:36
9.	"Error of Universe"	P-Model		1:24
10.	"Go Amigo"	Hirasawa; Akiyama	Akiyama	2:49
11.	"Psychoid"			3:20
12.	"No Room" (hidden track)			2:44

All tracks arranged by Hirasawa, except 2 & 8 by Kotobuki and 5 & 10 by Akiyama. All track titles are stylized in all caps. The total running time of the last track (the last two songs with 3 minutes of silence separating them) is 8:48.

== Personnel ==
P-Model

- Susumu Hirasawa - vocals, electric guitar, synthesizers, Amiga ("Say" program - lead vocals on "Error of Universe", additional vocals on "Wire Self" and "Clear"), programming, producer, mixing engineer on "Grid"
- Katsuhiko Akiyama - synthesizers, programming, lead vocals on "Clear", backing vocals
- Hikaru Kotobuki - synthesizers, Compact Macintosh, programming, lead vocals on "Lab=01", backing vocals
- Yasuchika Fujii - electronic drums, backing vocals on "Vista"

technical

- Masanori Chinzei (Magnet) - engineer (mixing and recording), backing vocals on "Vista"
- Motohiro Yamada (Eggs), Hajime Nagai (Z's), Shinichi Tomita (Mix), Osamu Konishi (Den), Fumio Hasegawa (Sound Sky), Atsunori Horioka and Tsukasa Okamoto (Sonata Club) - second engineers
- Reiko Miyoshi (Tokyu Fun) - mastering engineer

visuals

- Kiyoshi Inagaki (D.D.T.) - art director, design
- Hideki Namai - photography
- Kazunori Yoshida - hair & make-up
- Akemi Tsujitani - styling
- Takaaki Taguchi - costume design
- Norimizu Ameya (inner, back photos) and Seiko Mikami (back photo) - objet d'art

operations

- Osamu Takeuchi (Polydor K.K.) - director
- I_{3} Promotion - management
  - Yūichi Kenjo - co-producer, backing vocals on "Vista"
- Hiroki Yamaguchi - personal manager
- Shoko Mashio, Takeshi Fujita - publicity coordination
- Tsutomu Fukushima - stage coordination
- Masami Fujii (Pre Octave) - publisher

special thanks

- AC Unit, Korg, Arai & Co., Rihito, M, Yasumi Tanaka

== Release history ==
Date	Label(s)	Format	Catalog	Notes
February 26, 1992	Polydor K.K.	CD	POCH-1128	
May 10, 2002; July 4, 2014	Chaos Union, Teslakite	CD	CHTE-0011	Remastered by Hirasawa. Part of Disc 7 of the Ashu-on [Sound Subspecies] in the solar system box set, alongside big body. Re-released with new packaging by Kiyoshi Inagaki.
September 8, 2004; December 5, 2012	UM³, USM Japan	CD	UPCY-6022; UPCY-9273	Part of the "GOLDEN☆BEST" budget bundle brand, packaged with big body. Reissue available for sale for a limited time.
May 2, 2012	Universal Music Japan, Tower Records	CD	PROT-1022	Limited reissue, sold only through Tower Records.
