= Malice Mizer discography =

Cataloging of published recordings by Malice Mizer

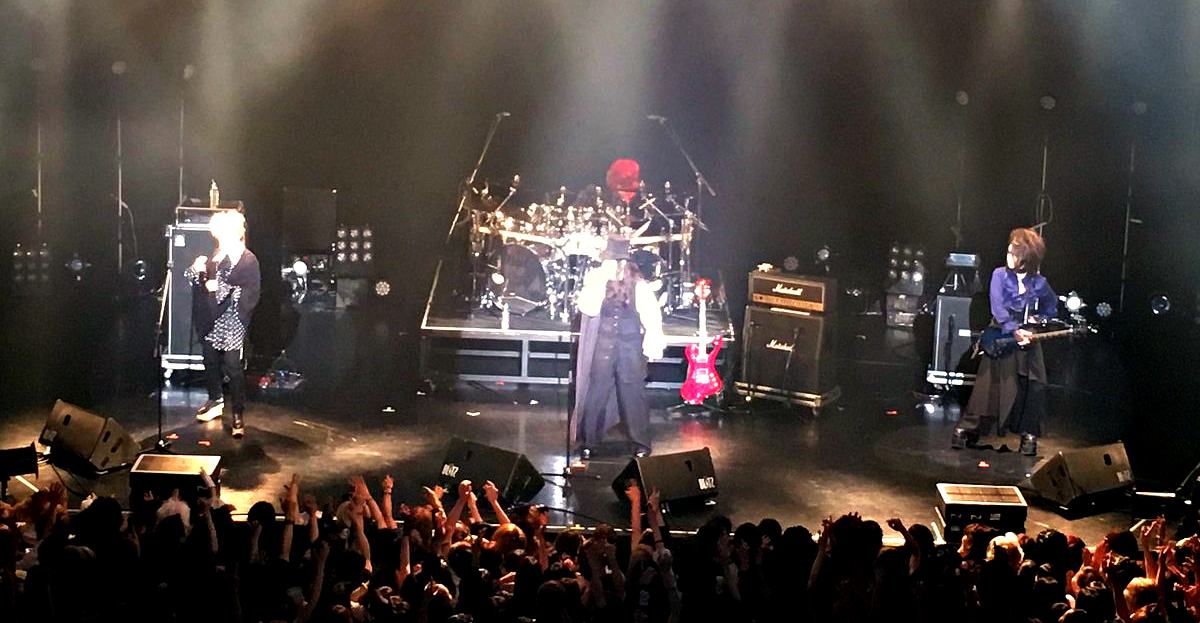
- Malice Mizer performing in 2016
- Studio albums: 4
- Extended plays: 1
- Soundtrack albums: 1
- Compilation albums: 3
- Singles: 14
- Video albums: 13
- Music videos: 11
- Demos: 3

The discography of Malice Mizer includes four studio albums, one extended play, and 14 singles. Formed by guitarists Mana and Közi in August 1992, the band saw three different vocalists in their nine-year career. Their earliest material, including first album Memoire (1994) with original vocalist Tetsu, was gothic rock. During second vocalist Gackt's era, which includes their best-selling album, Merveilles (1998), their music became more commercial and was characterized by strong French and classical influences. Malice Mizer's final years, featuring Klaha on vocals, incorporated Gothic-Victorian aspects after several tragedies befell the band. They went on an indefinite hiatus on December 11, 2001.

== Studio albums and EPs ==
List of albums and EPs, with selected chart positions, sales and certifications
Title	Release date	Peak chart positions		Sales	Certifications	Label
Title	Release date	Oricon	Billboard Japan	Sales	Certifications	Label
Memoire	July 24, 1994	—	—			Midi:Nette
Memoire DX	December 24, 1994	—	—			Midi:Nette
Voyage Sans Retour	June 9, 1996	—	—			Midi:Nette
Merveilles	March 18, 1998	2	3	307,450	RIAJ: Gold	Nippon Columbia
Shinwa (神話)	February 1, 2000	29	—	12,100		Midi:Nette
Bara no Seidou (薔薇の聖堂)	August 23, 2000	17	16	22,060		Midi:Nette

== Compilations ==
List of compilation albums, with selected chart positions and sales
Title	Release date	Peak chart position	Sales	Label
Title	Release date	Oricon	Sales	Label
La Collection des Singles (L'édition Limitée)	September 29, 2004	30	11,391	Nippon Columbia
La Collection "Merveilles" (L'édition Limitée)	October 5, 2005	64	3,214	Nippon Columbia
La Meilleur Selection de Malice Mizer	October 18, 2006	82	2,179	Nippon Columbia

== Demos ==
List of demos
Title	Release date	Label
Sans Logique	October 31, 1992	None
Sadness	April 5, 1993	None
Sadness / Speed of Desperate	1993	None
The 1th Anniversary	October 12, 1993	None

== Singles ==
=== Charted singles ===
List of charted singles, with selected chart positions, sales and certifications
Title	Year	Peak chart positions	Sales	Certifications	Album
Title	Year	JPN	Sales	Certifications	Album
"Bel Air (Kūhaku no Shunkan no Naka de)"	1997	20	56,570		Merveilles
"Au Revoir"	1997	10	112,560		Merveilles
"Gekka no Yasōkyoku"	1998	11	168,090	RIAJ: Gold	Merveilles
"Illuminati"	1998	7	117,410		Merveilles
"Le Ciel (Kūhaku no Kanata e)"	1998	4	117,240		Merveilles
"Saikai no Chi to Bara"	1999	17	42,340		Bara no Seidou
"Kyomu no Naka de no Yūgi"	2000	22	27,830		Bara no Seidou
"Shiroi Hada ni Kurū Ai to Kanashimi no Rondo"	2000	36	11,600		Bara no Seidou
"Gardenia"	2001	39	13,540		Non-album singles
"Beast of Blood"	2001	36	10,960		Non-album singles
"Mayonaka ni Kawashita Yakusoku"	2001	50	3,920		Bara no Seidou
"Garnet (Kindan no Sono e)"	2001	39	9,910		Non-album single

=== Full list ===
"Uruwashiki Kamen no Shoutaijou": Released: December 10, 1995; Label: Midi:Nette
No.	Title	Length
1.	"Uruwashiki Kamen no Shoutaijou" (麗しき仮面の招待状)	4:26
2.	"Après Midi (Aru Pari no Gogo de)" (APRÈS MIDI ～あるパリの午後で～)	5:22
3.	"Uruwashiki Kamen no Shoutaijou" (instrumental)	4:28
4.	"Après Midi (Aru Pari no Gogo de)" (instrumental)	5:23
5.	"Après Midi (Aru Pari no Gogo de)" (hidden track, alternate version; instrumental)	6:22
Total length:		26:36

"Ma Chérie (Itoshii Kimi e)": Released: October 10, 1996; Label: Midi:Nette
No.	Title	Length
1.	"Ma Chérie (Itoshii Kimi e)" (ma chérie ～愛しい君へ～)	5:24
2.	"Regret"	4:39
3.	"Ma Chérie (Itoshii Kimi e)" (instrumental)	5:03
Total length:		15:06

"Bel Air (Kūhaku no Shunkan no Naka de)": Released: August 6, 1997; Label: Nippon Columbia
No.	Title	Length
1.	"Bel Air (Kūhaku no Shunkan no Naka de)" (ヴェル・エール～空白の瞬間の中で～)	5:18
2.	"Color Me Blood Red"	3:02
3.	"Bel Air (Kūhaku no Shunkan no Naka De)" (instrumental)	5:18
Total length:		13:38

"Au Revoir": Released: December 3, 1997; Label: Nippon Columbia
No.	Title	Length
1.	"Au Revoir"	4:53
2.	"Au Revoir" (bossa)	5:26
3.	"Au Revoir" (instrumental)	4:54
Total length:		15:13

"Gekka no Yasōkyoku": Released: February 11, 1998; Label: Nippon Columbia
No.	Title	Length
1.	"Gekka no Yasōkyoku" (月下の夜想曲)	3:46
2.	"Gekka no Yasōkyoku de L'Image" (月下の夜想曲 de l'image)	3:50
3.	"Gekka no Yasōkyoku" (instrumental)	3:44
Total length:		11:20

"Illuminati": Released: May 20, 1998; Label: Nippon Columbia
No.	Title	Length
1.	"Illuminati" (P-Type)	5:12
2.	"N-p-s N-g-s" (N-Type)	4:27
3.	"Illuminati" (P-Type Instrumental)	5:12
Total length:		14:51

"Le Ciel (Kūhaku no Kanata e)": Released: September 30, 1998; Label: Columbia
No.	Title	Length
1.	"Le Ciel (Kūhaku no Kanata e)" (Le ciel ～空白の彼方へ～)	4:56
2.	"Le Ciel (Kūhaku no Kanata e)" (instrumental)	7:19
3.	Untitled (data track)	2:48
Total length:		15:03

"Saikai no Chi to Bara": Released: November 3, 1999; Label: Midi:Nette
No.	Title	Length
1.	"Saikai no Chi to Bara" (再会の血と薔薇)	5:22

"Kyomu no Naka de no Yūgi": Released: May 31, 2000; Label: Midi:Nette
No.	Title	Length
1.	"Kyomu no Naka de no Yūgi" (虚無の中での遊戯)	7:39
2.	"Kyomu no Naka de no Yūgi" (instrumental)	6:39
Total length:		14:18

"Shiroi Hada ni Kurū Ai to Kanashimi no Rondo": Released: July 26, 2000; Label: Midi:Nette
No.	Title	Length
1.	"Shiroi Hada ni Kurū Ai to Kanashimi no Rondo" (白い肌に狂う愛と哀しみの輪舞)	5:59
2.	"Shiroi Hada ni Kurū Ai to Kanashimi no Rondo" (instrumental)	5:41
Total length:		11:40

"Gardenia": Released: May 30, 2001; Label: Midi:Nette
No.	Title	Length
1.	"Prologue: Kaisou" (prologue ～回想～)	0:28
2.	"Gardenia"	5:14
3.	"Houkai Jokyoku" (崩壊序曲)	4:55
4.	"Gardenia" (instrumental)	5:15
5.	"Houkai Jokyoku" (instrumental)	4:52
Total length:		20:44

"Beast of Blood": Released: June 21, 2001; Label: Midi:Nette
No.	Title	Length
1.	"Beast of Blood"	5:09
2.	"Baptism of Blood"	2:39
3.	"Beast of Blood" (instrumental)	5:05
21.	"Bara no Souretsu" (薔薇の葬列, hidden track)	6:21
Total length:		20:22

"Mayonaka ni Kawashita Yakusoku": Released: October 30, 2001; Label: Midi:Nette
No.	Title	Length
1.	"Mayonaka ni Kawashita Yakusoku" (真夜中に交わした約束)	6:03
2.	"Mayonaka ni Kawashita Yakusoku" (instrumental)	6:08
3.	"Seinaru Toki Eien no Inori" (聖なる刻 永遠の祈り; instrumental)	8:14
4.	"Chikasuimyaku no Meiro" (地下水脈の迷路; instrumental)	5:32
Total length:		25:57

"Garnet (Kindan no Sono e)": Released: November 30, 2001; Label: Midi:Nette
No.	Title	Length
1.	"Garnet (Kindan no Sono e)" (Garnet ～禁断の園へ～)	4:33
2.	"Gensou Rakuen" (幻想楽園)	5:26
3.	"Garnet (Kindan no Sono e)" (instrumental)	4:34
4.	"Gensou Rakuen" (instrumental)	5:24
Total length:		19:57

== Videography ==
Title	VHS release date	DVD release date	Label	Type
Sans Retour Voyage "Derniere" ~Encoure Une Fois~	June 30, 1997	April 18, 2001	Midi:Nette	Concert film
Bel Air ~Kuuhaku no Shunkan no Naka De~ de L'Image (ヴェル・エール ～空白の瞬間の中で～ de l'image)	July 13, 1997	—	Nippon Columbia	Feature film
Merveilles ~Shuuen to Kisuu~ L'Espace (merveilles ～終焉と帰趨～ l'espace)	October 28, 1998	March 30, 2002	Nippon Columbia	Concert film
Merveilles ~Cinq Parallele~	February 24, 1999	March 30, 2002	Nippon Columbia	
Saikai no Chi to Bara ~de L'Image~ (再会の血と薔薇 ～de l'image～)	December 21, 1999	—	Midi:Nette	
Kyomu no Naka de no Yuugi ~de L'Image~ (虚無の中での遊戲 ～de l'image～)	May 31, 2000	—	Midi:Nette	
Bara ni Irodorareta Akui to Higeki no Makuake (薔薇に彩られた悪意と悲劇の幕開け)	November 22, 2000	November 22, 2000	Midi:Nette	Concert film
Bara no Kiseki (薔薇の軌跡)	April 25, 2001	April 25, 2001	Midi:Nette	
Beast of Blood ~de L'Image~	July 11, 2001	July 11, 2001	Midi:Nette	
Cardinal	—	February 6, 2002	Midi:Nette	Music video collection
Bara no Konrei ~Mayonaka ni Kawashita Yakusoku~ (薔薇の婚礼 ～真夜中に交わした約束～)	March 22, 2002	March 22, 2002	Midi:Nette	Feature film
Sélection de Performances Live	—	March 28, 2007	Columbia	Concert film
Deep Sanctuary VI: Malice Mizer 25th Anniversary Special Live at Toyosu Pit September 9	—	June 21, 2019	Spyglass Music	Concert film

=== Music videos ===
- "Bel Air" (1997)
- "Au Revoir" (1997)
- "Gekka no Yasōkyoku" (1998)
- "Illuminati" (1998)
- "Le Ciel" (1998)
- "Saikai no Chi to Bara" (1999)
- "Kyomu no Naka de no Yuugi" (2000)
- "Shiroi Hada ni Kurū Ai to Kanashimi no Rondo" (2000)
- "Beast of Blood" (2001)
- "Gardenia" (2001)
- "Mayonaka ni Kawashita Yakusoku" (2001)
- "Garnet (Kindan no Sono e)" (2001)
