= Beast of Blood (song) =

Single by Malice Mizer
- Released: June 21, 2001
- Genre: Hard rock
- Length: 19:14
- Label: Midi:Nette
- Composer: Mana
- Lyricist: Klaha

Malice Mizer singles chronology
"Gardenia" (2001)	"Beast of Blood" (2001)	"Mayonaka ni Kawashita Yakusoku" (2001)

"Beast of Blood" is the 12th single by Japanese visual kei rock band Malice Mizer, released by Midi:Nette on June 21, 2001. It reached number 36 on the Oricon Singles Chart, selling 10,960 copies.

== Summary ==
"Beast of Blood" was composed by Mana, one of the band's guitarists. The song has been described as a fusion of three musical styles: classical, metal, and pop. Organ and harpsichord arpeggios were overlaid with metal power chords and a "J-pop style chorus". The song is "rhythmically idiosyncratic", featuring abrupt tempo changes as it shifts between styles.

The lyrics to the song, written by Klaha, are in both English and Japanese. They have been described as "an ode to vampirism".

== Reception ==
The single reached number 36 and charted for a total of 2 weeks on the Oricon Singles Chart. It sold 10,960 copies. Despite not selling as well as Malice Mizer's most successful singles upon its release in 2001, "Beast of Blood" is considered to be one of the band's most popular releases.

Loryn Stone of Nerdbot ranked "Beast of Blood" as the best visual kei song of the late 1990s and early 2000s. Ranker.com listed "Beast of Blood" as one of three most popular Malice Mizer songs, along with "Gekka no Yasōkyoku" and "Au Revoir".

== Music video ==
The music video for "Beast of Blood" was shot mostly in black and white. Outside of the chorus, the only colorful thing is red blood flowing over a black and white checkered floor. The use of color in the video was inspired by the 1977 Italian horror film Suspiria. Throughout the video, members of the band (Mana, Közi, and Yu~ki), dressed in black gothic-inspired costumes and wearing heavy make-up, are shown playing classical string instruments, while Klaha acts as an orchestral conductor.

Present throughout the video are images of children in "various states of transformation". A featureless face emerges from blood and transforms into a young boy. In another instance, a young girl's eyes morph into a "disturbingly large size". Ken McLeod identified this concept as "liminal hybrid identity".

The video is consistent with the song's theme of vampirism. It "projects an image of historical opulence and wealth", amplified by the use of gilded mirrors and lavish velvet curtains. Its atmosphere was described as "evoking the […] imagery of the aristocratic world of Bram Stoker's Dracula".

== Track listing ==
No.	Title	Lyrics	Music	Length
1.	"Beast of Blood"	Klaha	Mana	5:09
2.	"Baptism of Blood"	Klaha	Mana	2:39
3.	"Beast of Blood (Instrumental)"		Mana	5:05
21.	"Bara no Souretsu (薔薇の葬列)"		Kami	6:21
Total length:				19:14

Notes

- Tracks 4–20 consist of a few seconds of silence each.
