= Gekka no Yasōkyoku =

Gekka no Yasōkyoku (月下の夜想曲) is a Japanese phrase that means "nocturne under the moonlight" and may refer to:

- Akumajō Dracula X: Gekka no Yasōkyoku, a 1997 video game released in English as Castlevania: Symphony of the Night
- Gekka no Yasōkyoku, a 1998 song by Malice Mizer released on their album Merveilles
