= D (band) =

Japanese visual kei metal/rock band

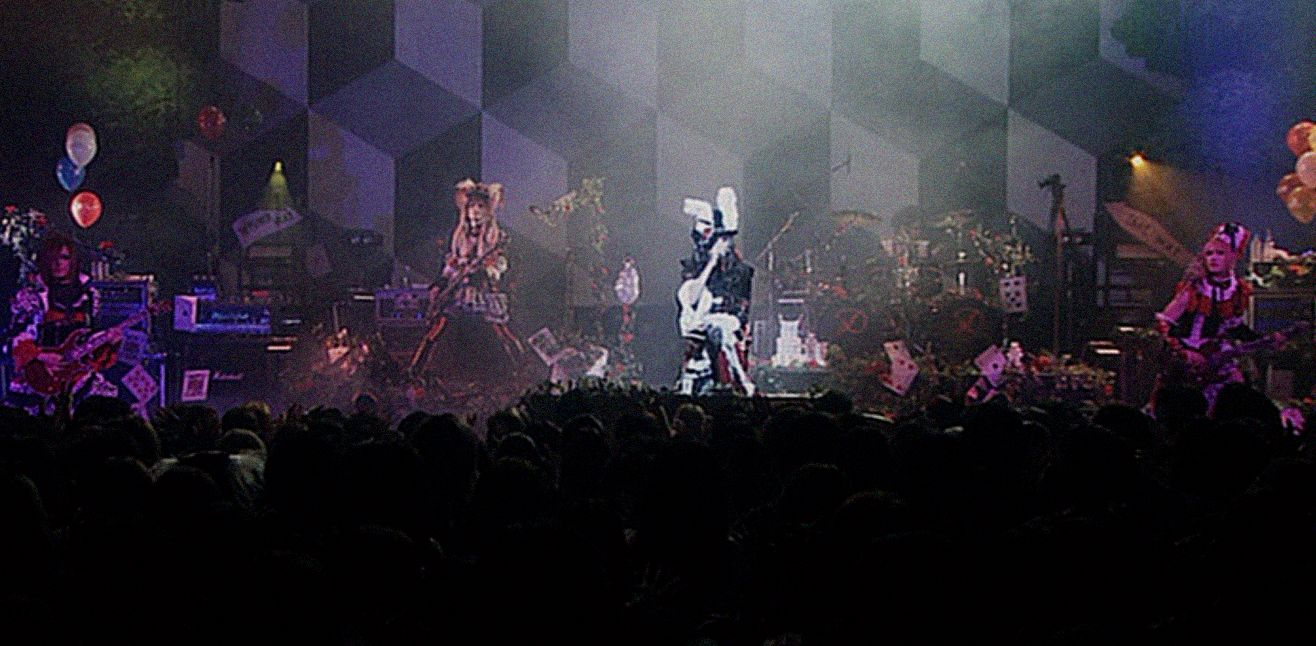
- D performing in 2016.

Background information
- Also known as: Night of the Children
- Origin: Kanagawa, Japan
- Genres: Symphonic metal; progressive metal; folk metal; melodic metalcore; gothic metal; hard rock
- Years active: 2003–present
- Labels: God Child Records; Avex; CJ Victor Entertainment (As of 2013); Gan-Shin (EU)
- Spinoff of: Syndrome
- Members: Asagi; Ruiza; Hide-Zou; Tsunehito; Hiroki
- Past members: Sin; Lena
- Website: D Official website

D (ディー, Dī) is a Japanese visual kei metal/rock band formed in 2003 by Asagi, Ruiza and Sin, after their previous band Syndrome disbanded. D's music includes heavy guitar songs, as well as melancholic ballads and even medieval music and folk dance from around the world. Their lyrics focus on love, human nature and esoteric themes, such as spirituality and the relationship between persons and nature, and their costumes are closely related to the stories they tell. Their styling matches their music: fantastical, gothic and elegant.

== History ==
=== 2003–2005: Formation and The Name of the Rose ===
In March 2003, D was formed with their initial lineup of vocalist Asagi, guitarist Ruiza, drummer Hiroki, guitarist Sin, and bassist Rena. They released their first EP, New Blood on July 18. Shortly before the release, Sin quit D, and not long after, Ruiza had to leave the band due to undisclosed health issues. D went on a short pause of activities from that point, however Asagi and Hiroki continued to play concerts under the name "Night of the Children" with a support guitarist, Tetsu. Meanwhile, Sin decided to leave the music scene and Hiroki called a former band member, Hide-Zou, to fill in. Once Ruiza was released from the hospital on September 27, D officially resumed activities with Hide-Zou replacing Sin on guitar. Two months after their reunion, they recorded their first single "Alice" which was given away for free at only one show in Tokyo that November. "Alice" was released as a single on November 27. On January 7 of the following year, they released their second EP: Paradox, which reached 13th place on the Oricon indies chart.

During 2004, D released another EP Yume Narishi Kuuchuu Teien, as well as a single entitled "Mayutsuki no Hitsugi", which was only for sale at three concerts in November, in Tokyo, Nagoya, and Osaka. They also released a remastered version of their first EP, with a previously unreleased track "Gareki no Hana". New Blood: Second Impact was released on December 8 of that year, quickly followed by their fourth single, "Mahiru no Koe: Synchronicity".

In 2005, Rena remained in the band long enough to release one more single and promotional video, "Yami Yori Kurai Doukoku no a Capella to Bara Yori Akai Jounetsu no Aria". On July 27, after finishing the recording of the forthcoming album, Rena left the band and Hide-Zou recorded bass for that release. They released their first full album titled The Name of the Rose on September 28 in two versions, each packaged with a DVD containing a different promotional video. D launched their own publication called Mad Tea Party Magazine on August 7.

=== 2006–2007: New lineup, Tafel Anatomie and Neo culture: Beyond the world ===
The band's logotype, used since 2006.

On December 5, 2005, Tsunehito joined as the new bassist. The band re-released their first full album: The Name of the Rose, with re-recorded bass tracks by Tsunehito. The updated album contained three extra tracks: "Shiroi Yoru", "Tsukiyo no Renka", and "Mayutsuki no Hitsugi". Keeping with the trend of remastering their old albums, in 2006 D re-released their EPs Paradox and Yume Narishi Kuchuu Teien. The latter came with two additional tracks that were previously unreleased. Their seventh single, "Taiyou wo Okuru Hi", was released in two types: a limited edition with the promotional video for the title track, and a regular edition with an instrumental version of the title track. Two months later they released their second album, Tafel Anatomie on October 18, which ranked 36th on the Oricon weekly chart.

In 2007, D launched an official fan club, Ultimate Lover, and released their first DVD of live concert footage, Tafel Anatomie: Tour 2006 Final on March 14. Soon after, the band announced in-store events and a three-date tour in Osaka, Nagoya, and Tokyo on their website to support their "Dearest You" single to be released on April 25. In the summer, D had a dual single release campaign, with "Ouka Sakisomenikeri" released on July 18 and "Schwarzschild" on August 15. On November 7, they released their third full-length album Neo culture: Beyond the world with an expanded version of their usual multiple-version marketing tactic; buyers could choose from two special editions each containing a DVD with different promotional video, and a regular edition with a thirty-six page booklet.

=== 2008–2010: Major label debut, Genetic World and 7th Rose ===
D signed with the major record label Avex Trax in 2008. Their last indies tour was called "Follow Me", and a DVD of footage from the final concert was released later in July. Their first major single called "Birth" was released on May 7. Their second major single, "Yami no Kuni no Alice/Hamon", was released on September 3. The title track was used as the theme for the movie Twilight Syndrome: Dead-Go-Round, and the b-side track "Hamon" was used as the ending theme for the Nintendo DS game Twilight Syndrome. Their first major label-sponsored concert entitled "Birth: Sora e no Kaiki" was held on August 8, followed by their year's end "Alice in Dark Edge" tour.

Their first activity of 2009 was the release of their third major single, "Snow White". Then on February 25, they released their fourth full-length album titled Genetic World. In the months following, they released a special combination concert photo book and live album "D Tour 2008: Alice in Dark Edge Final", and a live DVD: D Tour 2008: Alice in Dark Edge in March.

D's tour for Genetic World kicked off in April 2009 and ended that May. In September, Asagi opened a website for his company Rosen Kranz (in Japanese) (God Child Records). Soon they announced the revival of Mad Tea Party Magazine, and it was decided that the eleventh volume and eighth special edition photo book would be released on October 13. D's fourth major single "Tightrope" was released on September 23. A previously unreleased song "Day by Day" was soon announced to be the theme song for a dating simulation game for Japanese mobile phones called LoveφSummit, part of the Neo Romance series from KOEI, as well as the title track of a new single that was to be released on December 2.

The band's first single of 2010, "Kaze ga Mekuru Peji", was used as the opening theme for the television drama Shinsengumi Peacemaker, aired on TBS and MBS, and was scheduled for sale on March 10. Their fifth album, titled 7th Rose in honor of their seven years of activity, was released later that month. A compilation DVD: D 1st Video Clips containing footage from their short television program Bara no Yakata, and several promotional videos from their independent and major releases was also released on March 31.

Their single, "In the Name of Justice", was released on November 17, 2010. It featured two special editions, one carrying the song's PV, other packing "the making of" the title track, also including "Grand Master", and a regular edition featuring "Yoru no Me to Ginyushijin".

=== 2011–2012: World tour and Vampire Saga ===
On January 12, 2011, D released their sixth album called Vampire Saga. D covered Malice Mizer's song "Gekka no Yasōkyoku" for the compilation: Crush! -90's V-Rock Best Hit Cover Songs-. The album was released on January 26, 2011, and features current visual kei bands covering songs from bands that were important to the '90s visual kei movement.

"D is a future in the past. Darker than the darkness, redder than roses, speaking dreams, whispering love, we are people who love music."

— Asagi

In the spring of 2011, D did its first overseas tour through Torpedo Productions, in May the group visited Europe and played with the tour name "VAMPIRE SAGA in Europe - 'Path of the Rose'". They visited France, Germany, Italy, Austria, Russia, England and Finland, and were at Project A-Kon 2011 in Texas. After returning to Japan, they released the single "Torikago Goten ~L'Oiseau bleu~" and created their official Facebook page.

On November 21 the same year, the band released their new mini album titled Huang Di ~Yami ni Umareta Mukui~, the release was limited and sold out quickly thanks to the group's expanding fanbase and popularity.

On April 20, 2012, was the first stop of D's second European tour. To promote their new single "Dying Message" and also to again feel the energy of their western fans. Germany, the Netherlands, Belgium, Spain, Poland, Italy, Austria, Russia and Finland was on the tour schedule. Last show was May 9 in Russia. Following this, they embarked on their first South American Tour (Chile, Brazil and Argentina) in May. After the tour the group released the single "Dying Message" on May 30, 2012. On July 18, D released the single "Danzai no Gunner". In the PV to "Danzai no Gunner", Asagi (vocal) used a gun for the first time to save Tsunehito (bass) from a mad doctor. From July to August the band did a promotion tour called "Danzai no Gunner". On October 18, the band released a documentary DVD about their visit in Europe "Dying message ~2012 Overseas Odyssey Tour Documentary & Off-Shot".

On November 4, the band appeared on YouTube on the Online TV-show (visual kei)Viju Love Cafe, where they promoted their latest PV for "Namonaki Mori no Yumegatari". On November 14, the band released their latest EP called Namonaki Mori no Yumegatari with songs including "Hikari no Niwa", "Canis Lupus" and "Like a Black Cat - Mujitsu No Tsumi". The musicians are still in their infant years, reaching out into the world and broadening the visual kei stage.

=== 2013–2014: 10th Anniversary and Kingdom ===
In April 2013, around the celebration of their 10th anniversary, D released news about joining the major label Victor Entertainment. They released Treasure box, a greatest hits album which includes songs from their times under God Child Records label. Later that year, they released Bloody Rose "Best Collection 2007-2011", which includes material from their Avex Trax era.

In May 2013, the band started their 10th anniversary tour. Between May 1 till 5th each band member had a show where their played their personal favorites from the band's many songs. The next 5 dates each had a show for each big record the band had released during their 10 years of performing. The band has expressed interest for a new tour in Europe.

In July 2013, the band began touring Japan and visiting each of the members home towns in celebration of their major label signing with a new visual for "Rosenstrauss", focusing the theme of the tour on the character "Rosalie" of their vampire story. Hiroki collaborated with many musicians on Dead End's tribute album, specifically on the song "Dress Burning".

On March 26, 2014, the band released new Best of album titled D Vampire Chronicle: V-Best Selection. Their seventh full-length album titled Kingdom was released on November 12, 2014. This album, it will continue D's popular vampire story, but is also described as a musical biography of the band: "beautiful, violent and transcending genre boundaries". D has announced that they went on an activity pause next year after finishing their 47-prefectures live tour due to worsening of vocalist Asagi's temporomandibular joint disorder.

=== 2015–present: Wonderland Savior ===
D's hiatus ended in mid 2015. On December 9, 2015, they released a new single "Master Key". This single continues the "Alice in Wonderland" theme that also ran through D's previous single "Happy Unbirthday", which was released in September. D held a tour also named "MASTER KEY" starting from November, they held the tour final at Akasaka Blitz (with the guests: Hello Kitty and My Melody) on December 11.

On April 27, 2016, Asagi released a major debut solo single titled "Seventh Sense/屍の王者/アンプサイ". It features many well-known artists, including Hiro and Shuse of La'cryma Christi, Sakura of Zigzo, Hitoki of Kuroyume, Keiichi Miyako of Sophia, Ken Morioka of Soft Ballet, Sakito of Nightmare, Shinya of Dir En Grey, Shinya of Luna Sea, K-A-Z of Sads and many more. On October 26, D released their first album after their return from hiatus. They released their eighth album called Wonderland Savior.

In 2023, the band teamed up with Moi dix Mois, Versailles and Matenrou Opera for the four-date Japanese Visual Metal tour between September 22 and October 2. The four bands collaborated on the song "Kyōsōkyoku ~Tanbinaru Kettō~", which was released as a single credited to the JVM Roses Blood Symphony.

== Members ==
- Asagi (浅葱), born on August 29, 1974, in Noshiro, Akita, is the vocalist, lyricist, and one of the main songwriters of D. Previously in the bands Balsamic (1994–1997), Je*Reviens (1998–2001), and Syndrome (2001–2002), he was also in a side project called Kochou with Tinc's drummer Takuma, formerly known as Shion in Syndrome. He founded the company record label God Child Records in 2006, under which D released most of their independent era works. He released a solo single that year entitled "Corvinus", and also developed a perfume of the same name, under the God Child subsidiary Rosen Kranz.
- Ruiza (涙沙), D's guitarist and other main songwriter, was born on February 18, 1979, in Itami, Hyougo. He was previously in the bands Distray (1996–1999), Laybial (1999–2000), and Syndrome. Ruiza has also released three solo EPs: Ao no Hahen in 2002,amenity gain in 2006 and abyss in 2012 (the latter two stylized without capitals).
- Hide-Zou (英蔵), born in Kanagawa on November 19, 1977, is the second guitarist of D. He was previously in the bands Lapis (1995–1997), Clair de Lune (1997–2000), As'Real (2000–2002), and S to M (2002–2003).
- Tsunehito (恒人), D's current bass player, was born on March 5, 1984, in Yokohama, Kanagawa. His previous bands include Relude (2001–2003), Givuss (2003–2004), and Scissor (2004–2005).
- Hiroki (大城) was born on July 20, 1975, in Gunma, and is the drummer of D. He was previously in the bands Overtaker (1998–2000), Michiru Project (2001–2001), Aioria (2001–2002), and S to M (2002–2003).
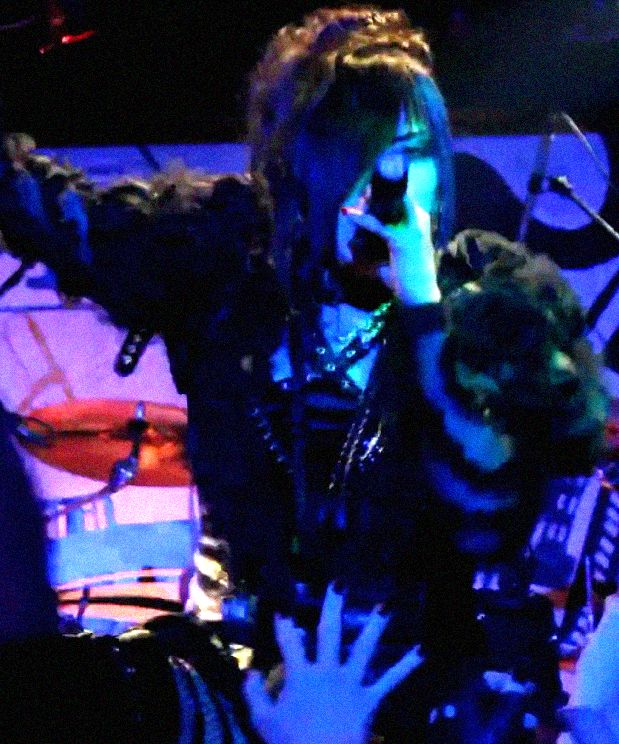
Asagi

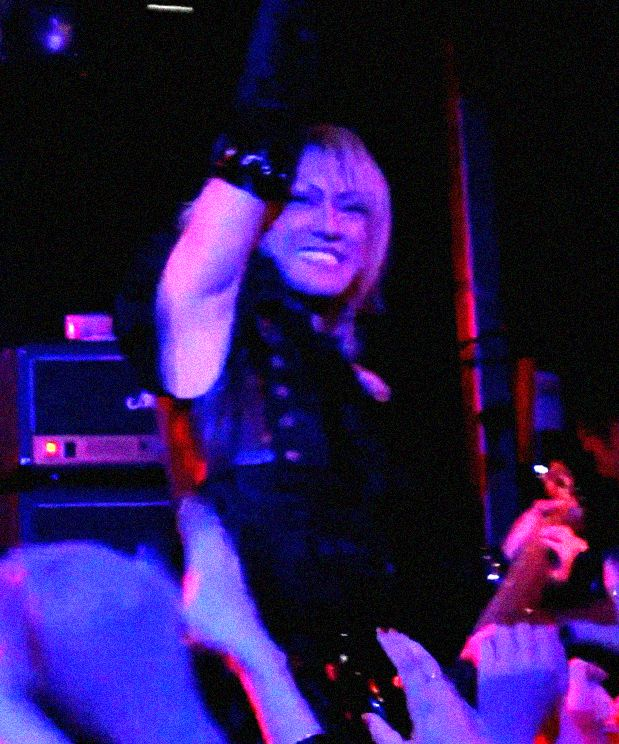
Ruiza

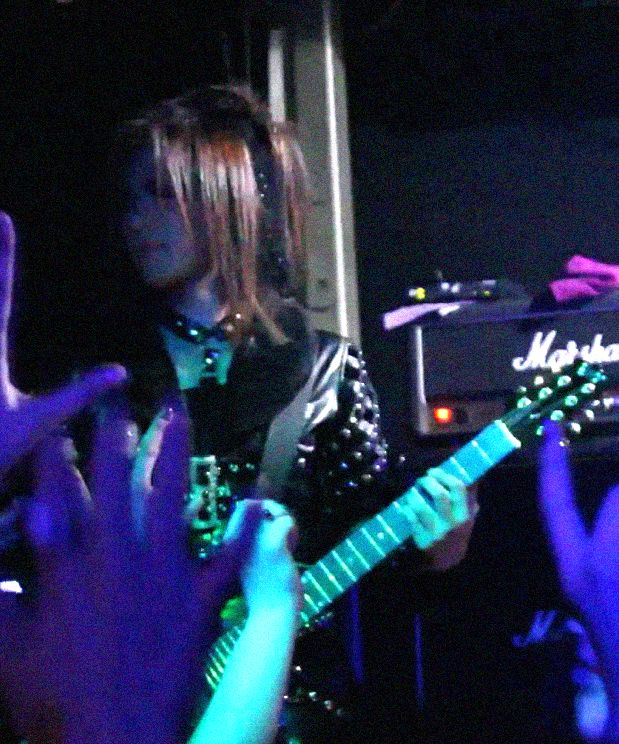
Hide-Zou

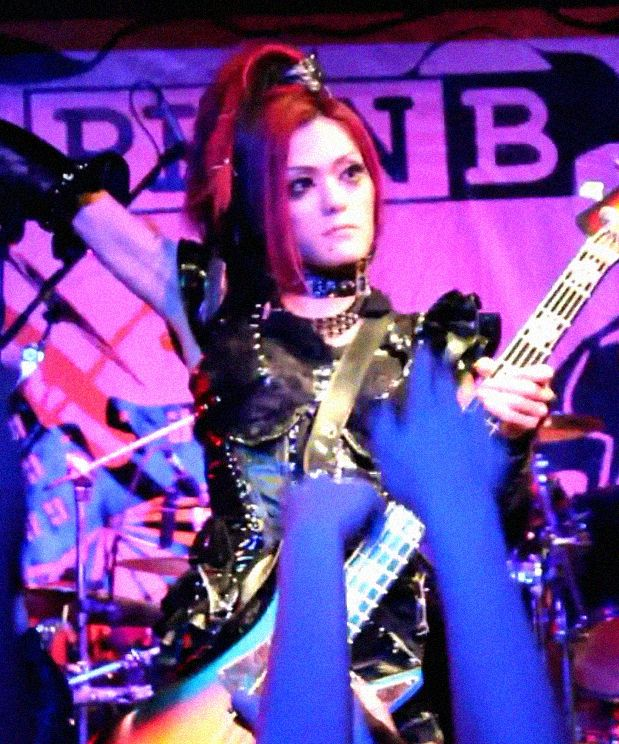
Tsunehito

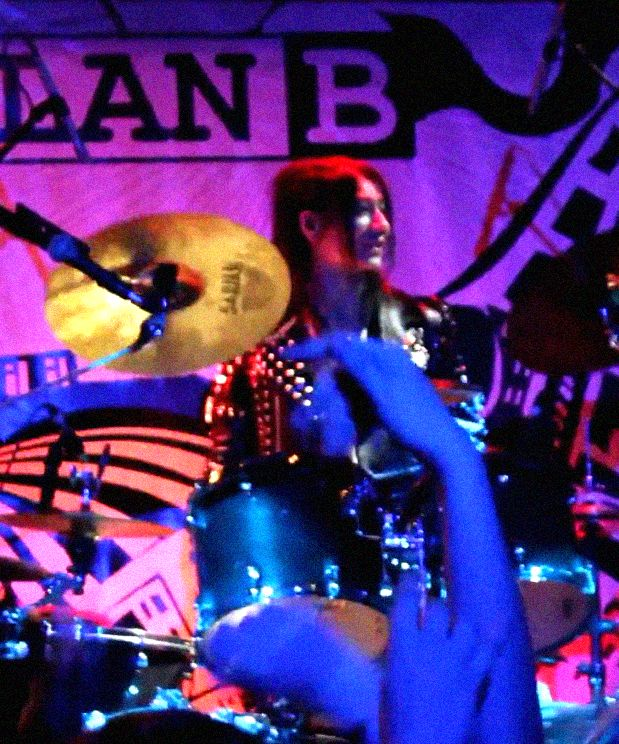
Hiroki

Timeline

== Influence ==
Asagi said that X Japan, Luna Sea, Malice Mizer, L'Arc-en-Ciel, and Buck-Tick are the Japanese bands that influenced them the most. Asagi's favorite singers are women, naming Enya, Björk, and Amy Lee of Evanescence. Hiroki's favorites bands are Skid Row and Dream Theater, while Ruiza picked X Japan and Dream Theater, and Hide-Zou chose Luna Sea. Tsunehito's favorite Japanese bands are Kuroyume and Buck-Tick. Ruiza and Hide-Zou stated that they were influenced by Kouichi from Laputa.

== Discography ==
=== Singles ===
- "Alice" (November 27, 2003)
- "Yume Narishi Kuuchuu Teien" (夢なりし空中庭園) (May 12, 2004)
- "Mayutsuki no Hitsugi" (繭月の棺) (November 4, 2004)
- "Mahiru no Koe ~Synchronicity~" (真昼の声 ~Synchronicity~) (January 12, 2005)
- "Shiroi Yoru" (白い夜) (February 17, 2005)
- "Yami Yori Kurai Doukoku no Acapella to Bara Yori Akai Jounetsu no Aria" (闇より暗い慟哭のアカペラと薔薇より赤い情熱のアリア) (June 22, 2005) Oricon Weekly Singles Top Position: 81
- "Taiyou wo Okuru hi" (太陽を葬（おく）る日) (August 3, 2006)
- "Dearest You" (April 25, 2007), Oricon Weekly Singles Top Position: 43
- "Ouka Saki Some ni Keri" (桜花咲きそめにけり) (July 18, 2007)
- "Schwarzschild" (August 15, 2007)
- "Birth" (May 7, 2008), Oricon Weekly Singles Top Position: 8
- "Yami no Kuni no Alice/Hamon" (闇の国のアリス/波紋) (September 3, 2008), Oricon Weekly Singles Top Position: 9
- "Snow White" (January 21, 2009), Oricon Weekly Singles Top Position: 6
- "Tightrope" (September 23, 2009), Oricon Weekly Singles Top Position: 9
- "Day by Day" (December 2, 2009), Oricon Weekly Singles Top Position: 16
- "Kaze ga Mekuru Page" (風がめくる頁) (March 10, 2010), Oricon Weekly Singles Top Position: 22
- "Akaki Hitsuji ni Yoru Bansankai" (赤き羊による晩餐会) (July 28, 2010), Oricon Weekly Singles Top Position: 24
- "In the name of justice" (November 17, 2010), Oricon Weekly Singles Top Position: 22
- "Torikago Goten ~L'Oiseau Bleu~" (鳥籠御殿 ~L’Oiseau bleu~) (July 28, 2011)
- "Huang Di ~Yami ni Umareta Mukui~" (皇帝 ~闇に生まれた報い~) (November 21, 2011)
- "Nyanto-shippo "De"!?" (February 13, 2012)
- "Ultimate lover" (February 13, 2012)
- "Dying Message" (May 30, 2012)
- "Danzai no Gunner" (断罪の銃士) (July 18, 2012)
- "Bon Voyage!" (April 12, 2013)
- "Rosenstrauss" (August 28, 2013)
- "Dark wings" (December 11, 2013)
- "Taiyou o Se ni Shite" (太陽を背にして) (December 15, 2013)
- "Tsuki no Sakazuki" (月の杯) (July 23, 2014)
- "Dandelion" (December 13, 2014)
- "Happy Unbirthday" (September 16, 2015)
- "Master Key" (December 9, 2015)
- "Himitsu kessha K club" (秘密結社 K倶楽部) (July 16, 2016)

=== Mini albums ===
*New Blood (July 18, 2003)
| No. | Title | Length |
|---|---|---|
| 1. | "Vampire Missa" |
| 2. | "Dangan" |
| 3. | "Eden" |
| 4. | "Lost Breath" |

*Paradox (January 7, 2004)
| No. | Title | Length |
|---|---|---|
| 1. | "Face" |
| 2. | "Night-ship "D"" |
| 3. | "Angelic Blue" |
| 4. | "Hanamadoi" |
| 5. | "Pride" |

*New Blood: Second Impact (December 8, 2004) – Remastered Edition
| No. | Title | Length |
|---|---|---|
| 1. | "Vampire Missa" |
| 2. | "Dangan" |
| 3. | "Eden" |
| 4. | "Lost Breath" |
| 5. | "Gareki no Hana" |

*Yume Narishi Kuuchuu Teien (夢なりし空中庭園) (May 3, 2006) – Remastered Edition
| No. | Title | Length |
|---|---|---|
| 1. | "Yume Narishi Kuchuu Teien (Instrumental)" |
| 2. | "Love Means Sacrifice" |
| 3. | "Kuuchuu Teien" |
| 4. | "Danpen Asymmetry" |
| 5. | "Bara no Kioku" |

*Paradox (May 3, 2006) – Remastered Edition
| No. | Title | Length |
|---|---|---|
| 1. | "Face" |
| 2. | "Night-ship "D"" |
| 3. | "Angelic blue" |
| 4. | "Hana Madoi" |
| 5. | "Pride" |

*Huang Di ~Yami ni Umareta Mukui~ (皇帝 ~闇に生まれた報い~) (November 21, 2011)
| No. | Title | Length |
|---|---|---|
| 1. | "Huang Di ~Yami ni Umareta Mukui~" |
| 2. | "Makutsu onshuuki" |
| 3. | "Hono no kairo" |
| 4. | "Gikyo so Den" |
| 5. | "Ryugan no shizuku" |
| 6. | "Sansuishi" |

*Namonaki Mori no Yumegatari (名もなき森の夢語り) (November 14, 2012)
| No. | Title | Length |
|---|---|---|
| 1. | "Hikari no Niwa" |
| 2. | "Namonaki Mori no Yumegatari" |
| 3. | "Canis Lupus" |
| 4. | "Shirarezaru Kodomotachi" |
| 5. | "Sankaku Oyane to Aware na Koguma" |
| 6. | "Like a Black Cat ~Mujitsu no Tsumi~" |
| 7. | "Haru no Utage" |
| 8. | "Zou to Hito to Ari to" |
| 9. | "Namonaki Mori no Yumegatari (voiceless)" |

*Revive ～Kohai Toshi～ (荒廃都市) (June 27, 2018)
| No. | Title | Length |
|---|---|---|
| 1. | "Revive ～Kohai Toshi～" |
| 2. | "Next Generation" |
| 3. | "エトワール ～白き異端者～" |
| 4. | "Dimaond shape (Instrumental)" |

*Deadly sin (荒廃都市) (November 14, 2018)
| No. | Title | Length |
|---|---|---|
| 1. | "Deadly sin" |
| 2. | "STAR SAPPHIRE" |
| 3. | "The Secret Rose Garden" |
| 4. | "Blood war (Instrumental)" |

=== Studio albums ===
- The Name of the Rose (September 28, 2005) Oricon Weekly Albums Top Position: 85
  - The Name of the Rose – Remastered Edition (February 8, 2006), Oricon Weekly Albums Top Position: 83
- Tafel Anatomie (October 18, 2006), Oricon Weekly Albums Top Position: 36
- Neo Culture: Beyond the World (November 7, 2007), Oricon Weekly Albums Top Position: 31
- Genetic World (February 25, 2009), Oricon Weekly Albums Top Position: 11
- 7th Rose (March 24, 2010), Oricon Weekly Albums Top Position: 37
- Vampire Saga (January 12, 2011), Oricon Weekly Albums Top Position: 29
- Kingdom (November 12, 2014)
- Wonderland Savior (October 26, 2016)

=== Live albums ===
- Tour 2008: Alice in Dark Edge Final (March 18, 2009)

=== Compilation albums ===
- Treasure Box (April 7, 2013)
- Bloody Rose "Best Collection 2007-2011" (August 21, 2013)
- D Vampire Chronicle: V-Best Selection (March 26, 2014)

=== DVDs ===
- Tafel Anatomie: Tour 2006 Final (March 14, 2007)
- Last Indies Tour 2008 Final: Follow Me (July 30, 2008)
- Tour 2008: Alice in Dark Edge Final (March 18, 2009)
- D 1st Video Clips (March 31, 2010)
- In the Name of Justice Tour Final 2010 (April 27, 2011)
- D Tour 2011 Vampire Saga ~Path of the Rose~ (October 20, 2011)
- Dying message: 2012 Overseas Odyssey Tour Documentary & Off-Shot (October 18, 2012)
- D 10th Anniversary Special Premium Live 2013 "Bon Voyage!" (October 30, 2013)
- D Tour 2013 Rosenstrauss Documentary DVD (October 7, 2014)
- 47 Todoufuken Tour Final At Maihama Amphitheater (March 18, 2015)
- Ultimate lover Dai Nijyu-ichi ya (Ultimate lover 第二十一夜) (April 29, 2015)
- D Tour 2015 Master Key Tour Document & 3songs Live (April 6, 2016)
- Happy Unbirthday 2015.8.29 Akasaka BLITZ (April 6, 2016)
