= Le Ciel (Kūhaku no Kanata e) =

Single by Malice Mizer

from the album Merveilles
- Released: September 30, 1998
- Genre: Art rock
- Length: 15:03
- Label: Nippon Columbia
- Songwriter: Gackt C.

Malice Mizer singles chronology
"Illuminati" (1998)	"Le Ciel (Kūhaku no Kanata e)" (1998)	"Saikai no Chi to Bara" (1999)

"Le Ciel (Kūhaku no Kanata e)" (Japanese: Le ciel 〜空白の彼方へ〜) is the seventh single by Japanese visual kei rock band Malice Mizer, released by Nippon Columbia on September 30, 1998. It reached number 4 on the Oricon Singles Chart, selling 117,240 copies. It was the fifth single released from the Merveilles album.

== Summary ==
"Le Ciel (Kūhaku no Kanata e)" was written by Gackt. He was inspired to write this song during the filming of the music video for Malice Mizer's "Bel Air" in the countryside of France. According to Gackt, the lyrics to "Le Ciel" explore themes such as kindness, justice, and evil.

In the music video to the song, the band members wore white costumes, which, according to Mana, were meant to convey "a floating feeling". In live performances, Gackt wore a black costume to present a different version of the song's story.

== Reception ==
The single reached number 4 and charted for a total of 6 weeks on the Oricon Singles Chart, becoming the band's highest-charting single. It sold 117,240 copies.

== Track listing ==
All tracks are written by Gackt C.

No.	Title	Length
1.	"Le Ciel (Kūhaku no Kanata e) (Le ciel ～空白の彼方へ～)"	4:56
2.	"Le Ciel (Kūhaku no Kanata e) (Instrumental) (Le ciel ~空白の彼方へ~ (Instrumental))"	7:19
3.	"Untitled (data track)"	2:48
Total length:		15:03
