= Bel Air (Kūhaku no Shunkan no Naka de) =

- First press edition cover art

Single by Malice Mizer

from the album Merveilles
- Released: July 19, 1997
- Genre: Art rock
- Label: Nippon Columbia
- Composer: Mana
- Lyricist: Gackt C.

Malice Mizer singles chronology
"Ma Chérie (Itoshii Kimi e)" (1996)	"Bel Air (Kūhaku no Shunkan no Naka de)" (1997)	"Au Revoir" (1997)

"Bel Air (Kūhaku no Shunkan no Naka de)" (Japanese: ヴェル・エール～空白の瞬間の中で～; "Bel Air ~In the Blank Time~") is the third single by Japanese visual kei rock band Malice Mizer, released by Nippon Columbia on July 19, 1997. It reached number 20 on the Oricon Singles Chart, selling 56,570 copies. It was the first single released from the Merveilles album.

== Reception ==
The first press edition of the single reached number 20 and charted for a total of 3 weeks on the Oricon Singles Chart. It sold 41,090 copies. The standard edition was released the following month, August 6, and peaked at number 42, selling 15,480 copies. In total, the single sold in 56,570 copies.

Japanese pop culture website Real Sound credited Malice Mizer as the first visual kei band to incorporate European aesthetics into heavy metal with the twin guitars in "Bel Air". The song was described as "the dawn of visual kei aesthetic metal". In 2016, the "Bel Air" music video was parodied by Golden Bomber in "Yokubo no Uta" (欲望の歌).

== Music video ==
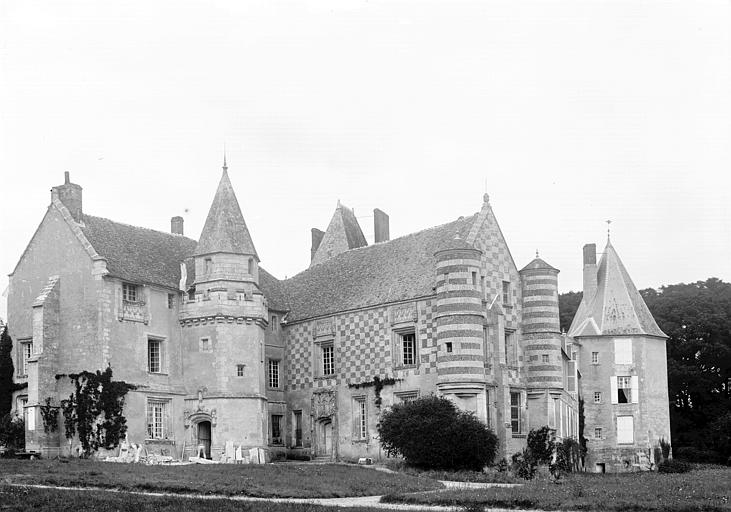
Château d'Alincourt

The music video for "Bel Air" was filmed in France. It was partially shot at the Château d'Alincourt in Parnes. A silent short film titled Verte Aile, serving as a prelude to the Merveilles album, was filmed alongside it. Both Verte Aile and the music video were praised by Edmund Yeo, noting how "Bel Air contains both blood-stained pacts in underground rooms and carefree frolicing in beautiful, sunlit gardens".

== Track listing ==
No.	Title	Lyrics	Music	Length
1.	"Bel Air (Kūhaku no Shunkan no Naka de) (ヴェル・エール～空白の瞬間の中で～)"	Gackt C.	Mana	5:18
2.	"Color Me Blood Red"	Közi	Közi	3:50
3.	"Bel Air (Kūhaku no Shunkan no Naka De) (Instrumental) (ヴェル・エール～空白の瞬間の中で～ (Instrumental))"		Mana	3:43
Total length:				13:38
