= Shinwa =

Shinwa may refer to several Japanese terms:

== "Harmony" ==
=== Shinwa (新和 "new harmony") ===
- Shinwa, Kumamoto (新和町 Shinwa-machi)

=== Shinwa (親和 "fraternal harmony") ===
- Shinwa, short for Kobe Shinwa Women's University (神戸親和女子大学 Kobe shinwa joshi daigaku)
- Shinwa-kai (親和会) a yakuza group based in Takamatsu, Kagawa

=== Shinwa (信和 "trust and harmony") ===
- Shinwa Kataoka (片岡信和 1985) Japanese actor

== Shinwa (神話 "myth") ==
- Shinwa (EP), an EP by Malice Mizer
- "Shinwa", a song by Hiroshi Ohguri
