= Saikai no Chi to Bara =

Single by Malice Mizer

from the album Bara no Seidou
- Released: November 3, 1999
- Genre: Neoclassical dark wave
- Length: 5:32
- Label: Midi:Nette
- Composer: Mana
- Lyricist: Mana

Malice Mizer singles chronology
"Le Ciel (Kūhaku no Kanata e)" (1998)	"Saikai no Chi to Bara" (1999)	"Kyomu no Naka de no Yūgi" (2000)

Alternative cover
- Side A of 12-inch vinyl single

"Saikai no Chi to Bara" (Japanese: 再会の血と薔薇; "The Blood and Rose of Reunion") is the eighth single by Japanese visual kei rock band Malice Mizer, released by Midi:Nette on November 3, 1999. It reached number 17 on the Oricon Singles Chart, selling 42,340 copies. It was the first single released from the Bara no Seidou album.

The single was released on CD and as a 12" picture disc vinyl.

== Summary ==
The track is a tribute to Malice Mizer's late drummer Kami. It was the band's first release after the departure of vocalist Gackt, before he was replaced by Klaha. Along with the song's release, Malice Mizer abandoned their previous lighter pop music sound for a mixture of classical music and dark wave, and adopted an elaborate funerary elegant gothic look. The instrumental arrangement features church organ, harpsichord, and string melodies. It was produced without a vocalist.

== Reception ==
The single reached number 17 and charted for a total of 4 weeks on the Oricon Singles Chart, becoming the band's fifth highest-charting single. It sold 42,340 copies.

The track holds a particular significance due to its symbolic association with Kami. On July 17, 2010, former Malice Mizer members Mana, Közi, and Yu~ki, held a reunion session under the name "Saikai no Chi to Bara". The intro to the song was performed on a keyboard by Mana during his guest appearance at Schwarz Stein's 15th anniversary live on November 12, 2017. The song served as an intro to Malice Mizer's 25th anniversary show in 2018.

== Track listing ==
No.	Title	Lyrics	Music	Length
1.	"Saikai no Chi to Bara (再会の血と薔薇)"	Mana	Mana	5:32
Total length:				5:32
