= Gardenia (Malice Mizer song) =

Single by Malice Mizer
- Released: May 30, 2001
- Genre: Art rock
- Length: 20:44
- Label: Midi:Nette
- Composer: Mana
- Lyricist: Klaha

Malice Mizer singles chronology
"Shiroi Hada ni Kurū Ai to Kanashimi no Rondo" (2000)	"Gardenia" (2001)	"Beast of Blood" (2001)

"Gardenia" is the 11th single by Japanese visual kei rock band Malice Mizer, released by Midi:Nette on May 30, 2001. It reached number 39 on the Oricon Singles Chart, selling 13,540 copies.

== Summary ==
The single was Malice Mizer's attempt at a return to a more pop-oriented sound after the darker and heavier Bara no Seidou album.

== Reception ==
The single reached number 39 and charted for a total of 3 weeks on the Oricon Singles Chart, becoming one of the band's lowest-charting singles. It sold 13,540 copies.

== Music video ==
A music video was shot for "Gardenia", although it was not publicly released in its entirety. In 2017, a fan of Malice Mizer restored the video using fragments of preview clips, and uploaded it to YouTube.

== Covers ==
"Gardenia" was covered by Moi dix Mois during Malice Mizer's 25th anniversary show in 2018.

== Track listing ==
No.	Title	Lyrics	Music	Length
1.	"Prologue: Kaisou" (prologue ～回想～)		Mana	0:28
2.	"Gardenia"	Klaha	Mana	5:14
3.	"Houkai Jokyoku" (崩壊序曲)	Klaha	Mana	4:55
4.	"Gardenia" (instrumental)		Mana	5:15
5.	"Houkai Jokyoku" (instrumental)		Mana	4:52
Total length:				20:44
