= Shinwa (EP) =

EP by Malice Mizer
- Released: February 1, 2000
- Recorded: 1999–2000
- Studio: On Air Azabu St
- Genre: Neoclassical dark wave; progressive electronic
- Length: 12:24
- Label: Midi:Nette
- Producer: Malice Mizer

Malice Mizer chronology
Merveilles (1998)	Shinwa (2000)	Bara no Seidou (2000)

Shinwa (Japanese: 神話; "Myth") is an EP by Japanese rock band Malice Mizer, released on February 1, 2000. It is dedicated to the band's former drummer Kami, who died the previous year and composed two of its songs.

== Overview ==
Kami had been wanting to start composing songs for a while, he would practice guitar and bought a synthesizer for that purpose. When he died in June 1999, rather than hold a public memorial service for him, the remaining members chose to finish and release two of his songs that they felt best conveyed the drummer's feelings. They waited to release it on February 1 of the following year, which is Kami's birthday.

Kami first showed the band the songs in April 1999, the first time he had ever shown them his compositions. They were already titled. Mana described the two tracks as polar opposites. The guitarist described "Unmei no Deai", which Kami said had a French-like image, as having a "gentleness" that Malice Mizer had never done before. It was the most difficult song on the EP, and undertook a significant change while they arranged it.

Mana felt that "Mori no Naka no Tenshi" was brighter and said it has a "fun feeling." Wanting to keep that happy and energetic feeling, the band did not want a tightly arranged guitar part. It also marks the first time that Mana and Közi had played/recorded guitar in a while. The remaining members composed the opening track "Saikai" to show their feelings for Kami.

In the album booklet, the two songs have French "image lyrics". Malice Mizer wrote these based on the titles that Kami gave the songs. However, only "Unmei no Deai" has an audible vocal track. Kami is credited as "Eternal Blood Relative", and would continue to be on all of Malice Mizer's subsequent releases. The cover illustration is of a blue morpho, as Kami was known for his love of butterflies. Shinwa is a box set, with a VHS containing video footage from some of their concerts set to the songs contained on the EP.

== Track listing ==
Shinwa track listing
No.	Title	Lyrics	Music	Arrangement	Length
1.	"Saikai" (再会; "Reunion")		Malice Mizer	Malice Mizer	1:29
2.	"Unmei no Deai" (運命の出会い; "Meeting with Fate")	Malice Mizer	Kami	Malice Mizer	5:10
3.	"Mori no Naka no Tenshi" (森の中の天使; "Angels in the Woods")	Malice Mizer	Kami	Malice Mizer	5:45

== Personnel ==
- Malice Mizer
- Kami – eternal blood relative
- Hitoshi Konno – violin
- Motohide Tanaka – director
- Nobuhiko Nakayama – synthesizer programming and sound design
- Yoichiro Kano – recording and mixing
- Masao Nakazato – mastering

== Charts ==
Chart performance for Shinwa
Chart (2000)	Peak position
Japanese Albums (Oricon)	29
