= Illuminati (Malice Mizer song) =

Single by Malice Mizer

from the album Merveilles
- Released: May 20, 1998
- Genre: Electronic rock
- Length: 14:51
- Label: Nippon Columbia
- Composer: Közi
- Lyricist: Gackt C.

Malice Mizer singles chronology
"Gekka no Yasōkyoku" (1998)	"Illuminati" (1998)	"Le Ciel (Kūhaku no Kanata e)" (1998)

"Illuminati" is the sixth single by Japanese visual kei rock band Malice Mizer, released by Nippon Columbia on May 20, 1998. It reached number 7 on the Oricon Singles Chart, selling 117,410 copies. It was the fourth single released from the Merveilles album.

== Summary ==
"Illuminati" was composed by Közi, one of the band's guitarists. The song's lyrics, written by Gackt, reference various conspiracy theories. The song has been described as having "heavy erotic themes".

== Reception ==
The single reached number 7 and charted for a total of 8 weeks on the Oricon Singles Chart, becoming the band's second highest-charting single. It sold 117,410 copies. "Illuminati" was used as an ending theme for the YTV and NTV show "Downtown DX".

== Music video ==
The music video for "Illuminati" was intended to be controversial or shocking for its viewers. It was filmed in a "chaotic, frenetic style", featuring violent and erotic themes. It features Malice Mizer members "feasting" on nude bodies of women and being subjected to scientific experiments.

The "Illuminati" music video was credited with influencing the early 2000s trend of visual kei bands incorporating elements of fetish wear into gothic fashion. The music video was parodied by Golden Bomber in "Yokubo no Uta" (欲望の歌).

== Track listing ==
No.	Title	Lyrics	Music	Length
1.	"Illuminati (P-Type)"	Gackt C.	Közi	5:12
2.	"N-p-s N-g-s (N-Type)"	Gackt C.	Mana	4:27
3.	"Illuminati (P-Type Instrumental)"		Közi	5:12
Total length:				14:51

== Covers ==
Malice Mizer's "Illuminati" was covered by Moran on the compilation album Crush!2 -90's V-Rock Best Hit Cover Songs-. The album was released on November 23, 2011, and features current visual kei bands covering songs from bands that were important to the 1990s visual kei movement.
