= Masayuki Deguchi =

Japanese singer and songwriter

Masayuki Deguchi 出口 雅之
- Also known as: Rev
- Born: September 22, 1963 (age 63); Gunma Prefecture
- Genre: Pop rock
- Occupations: singer; songwriter
- Years active: 1984–
- Labels: CBS Sony (1984–1992); Zain Records (1993–1994); BMG Japan (1996–1997)
- Website: d-syst.com/md/index.html

Masayuki Deguchi (出口雅之, Deguchi Mayasuki; born September 22, 1963) is a Japanese singer and songwriter. He's best known to be a vocalist of a band Grass Valley (1987-1992) and for his solo project Rev (1993-1994).

== Biography ==
In 1987 he started his career as leader of rock band GRASS VALLEY under CBS Sony, in 1992 the band has disbanded. During band career has released 8 studio albums and 9 singles.

In 1993 he started own solo unit Rev under Zain Records from Being Inc. recording company. On April he made major debut with single Amai Kiss Kiss, in media it was used as a commercial song for Miki Corporation's Camellia Diamond. The single reached No. 8 on Oricon Weekly Charts, charted for 9 weeks and sold more than 195,000 copies. On June, Masayuki participated in collaboration single Hateshinai Yume wo with Zard, the members of Wands and Zyyg as vocalist and as composer. The single was used as a theme song for NTV television sport program Geki Kuukan Pro Yakyuu93. The single was recorded for the first time on the Zard compilation album ZARD BEST The Single Collection: Kiseki in 1999. On October his second single Dakishimetai entered to Top 5 of Oricon Weekly Chart, selling more than 230,000 copies making it the biggest hit from his REV career. In media it was used as commercial song for Lotte's product Crunky Stick. On December he released debut album Rev, the album charted #7 on Oricon Weekly Charts. sold more than 156,000 copies and charted over 10 weeks. The album includes self-cover version of Hateshinai Yume wo under subtitle Rev version.

In February 1994 the third single Ikusen no Jounetsu was used in media as an opening theme for Tokyo Broadcasting System Television music program Count Down TV. The single sold only 99,000 copies which makes the lowest sells from the whole career. On September Masayuki releases his final single Break Down. In the media it was used as a commercial song for Pioneer Corporation's carrozzeria. With this final single on September he made his first and the last media appearance on music program Music Station. On the same month he releases his second and final studio album Moon with total 88,000 copies sold. On November he held three times his first and last live Live Mode. After then activities under name Rev has disappeared.

After one year of break, in 1996 he started his solo career under real name Masayuki Deguchi through BGM Japan label. During this period he releases two singles which didn't enter to Top 30 of Weekly Charts and two studio albums Speed of Life and Egoist. in 1997 March he went on hiatus.

In 1999 he formed own rock band Suicide Sport Car and band has disbanded in 2003, during five-year activity they've had released 2 studio albums and 5 singles.

In June 2003 he released studio album Salon de CASINO ROYALE under nickname Dandy D, the album didn't enter to Oricon Charts and soon this project ended.

In 2006, he formed unit Gentleman Take Poraloid with Ken Morioka, under indies label Palm Tree and in 2009 released studio album Orfeu.

In 2012 he released his first jazz cover album DECO JAZZ／MASAYUKI DEGUCHI WITH DECO from Palm Tree Records.

Three music videoclips from Rev period were released at 2-disc DVD set Legend of 90's J-Rock Best Live & Clips.

Nowadays Masayuki is active in live houses.

== Discography ==
=== Singles ===
	Release Day	Title	Chart
1st	1993/4/14	Amai Kiss Kiss (甘いKiss Kiss)	8
collab	1993/6/9	Hateshinai Yume wo (果てしない夢を)	2
2nd	1993/10/27	Dakishimetai (抱きしめたい)	4
3rd	1994/2/16	Ikusen no Jounetsu (幾千もの情熱)	17
4th	1994/8/31	Break Down	10
5th	1996/3/1	KISS IN THE MOON LIGHT	48
6th	1996/5/22	SPEED OF LIFE	98
7th	1996/6/21	Crush Beat	89
8th	1997/2/21	Kiseki no Kaze (奇跡の風)	–

=== Albums ===
	Release Day	Title	Chart
1st	1993/12/15	Rev	7
2nd	1994/9/28	Moon	9
3rd	1996/7/6	Speed of Life	60
4th	1997/3/21	Egoist	90

== Magazine appearances ==
From Music Freak Magazine:

- Vol.1 1994/November
- Vol.2 1994/December
