= Ken Morioka =

Ken Morioka 森岡賢
- Born: 15 March 1967
- Origin: Minato, Tokyo, Japan
- Died: 3 June 2016 (aged 49)
- Genres: Synthpop
- Occupations: Musician, keyboardist, composer, music producer
- Instrument: Keyboard
- Years active: 1982–2016

Ken Morioka (Japanese: 森岡賢; March 15, 1967 – June 3, 2016) was a Japanese musician, keyboardist, composer, and music producer. He died of heart failure at the age of 49.

In addition to being a member of influential synthpop group Soft Ballet, he worked with numerous other musicians such as Kaya, Buck-Tick, and ZIZ (with ex-Malice Mizer member Közi). He was also in the bands minus (-) and Ka.f.ka.

In 2006, he formed unit Gentleman Take Poraloid with Masayuki Deguchi, on the independent record label Palm Tree and in 2009, released the studio album Orfeu.
