= Voyage Sans Retour =

Studio album by Malice Mizer
- Released: June 9, 1996
- Studio: Bazooka, Wonder Beat, Cats
- Genre: Baroque pop; synthpop; art rock; dark cabaret
- Length: 44:37
- Label: Midi:Nette
- Producer: Malice Mizer

Malice Mizer chronology
Memoire (1994)	Voyage Sans Retour (1996)	Merveilles (1998)

Voyage Sans Retour (French: Journey Without Return) is the second album by Japanese rock band Malice Mizer, released on June 9, 1996. It is their first album with second vocalist Gackt.

== Overview ==
Malice Mizer's singer and lyricist Tetsu left the group after a concert on December 27, 1994. After almost a year of inactivity, Malice Mizer recruited Gackt as their new vocalist and released the single "Uruwashiki Kamen no Shoutaijou" on December 10, 1995. With a new concept, the band's music became more art rock and synthpop, incorporating even stronger classical and electronic elements. Visually, they abandoned their 1980s goth look for colorful historical costumes with a gothic feel. It features an instrumental arrangement of a song from the days of the first vocalist, Tetsu. This is the first song to feature Gackt playing the piano and credited for the arrangement.

Voyage was released on June 9, 1996 by guitarist Mana's own record label, Midi:Nette. The first press edition, limited to 5000 copies, came in a plastic slipcase with an additional "Visual Arts Booklet".

The theme of the album is "based on the story of vampires, taking a scalpel to the human world from the vampire's point of view", which also became the concept of their live performances before their major label debut.

== Track listing ==
Except for Track 7, all the songs subtitles are only included in the lyrics sheet.

No.	Title	Lyrics	Music	Length
1.	"Yami no Kanata e~" (闇の彼方へ～)		Mana	0:26
2.	"Transylvania"	Gackt	Mana	4:01
3.	"Tsuioku no Kakera" (追憶の破片(かけら)～a piece of broken recollection～)	Gackt	Mana	6:21
4.	"Premier Amour" (premier amour)	Gackt	Mana	4:55
5.	"Itsuwari no Musette" (偽りのmusette)	Gackt	Közi	5:13
6.	"N.p.s N.g.s" (N・p・s N・g・s～No pains No gains～)	Gackt	Mana	4:07
7.	"Claire ~Tsuki no Shirabe~" (claire～月の調べ～; "Melody of the Moon")	Gackt, Közi	Közi	5:47
8.	"Madrigal"	Gackt	Közi	4:03
9.	"Shi no Butō" (死の舞踏～a romance of the "Cendrillon"～)	Malice Mizer	Mana	5:25
10.	"~Zenchō~" (～前兆～)		Mana	4:19

== Personnel ==
=== Malice Mizer ===
- Gackt – vocals, piano
- Mana – synthesizer guitar programming, sequence programming
- Közi – synthesizer guitar programming, sequence programming
- Yu~ki – bass
- Kami – drums, percussion

=== Other personnel ===
- Takeshi Kanazawa – violin on tracks 2, 5 and 8
- Mayumi Maruo – chorus, photography
- "Patch" Kitaguchi – recording, mixing
- Yōhei Shimada - Sound advisor, piano tuner
