= Eve of Destiny =

Japanese industrial rock band

- Origin: Japan
- Genre: Industrial rock
- Years active: 1999–2005
- Members: Haruhiko Ash, Közi

Eve of Destiny was a Japanese industrial rock band founded by Haruhiko Ash (formerly of punk rock / hard rock band The Zolge). For a long time, Eve of Destiny was a solo project of Ash, with not much real activity, but this changed in 2002, after guitarist Közi of Malice Mizer fame joined and they started to tour outside Japan on a regular basis. The group has performed in Germany, Hungary, Switzerland, the Philippines, Slovakia, the Netherlands, Japan, France, Austria, Australia, Sweden, and Poland.

== Members ==
=== Haruhiko Ash ===
Prior to Eve of Destiny, Haruhiko Ash founded the Japanese hard rock band The Zolge and the Tokyo club Eve the New Church, a place to promote gothic music and the Japanese underground music scene. Ash was a close friend of Lords of the New Church vocalist Stiv Bators and his wife Caroline.

The Zolge was a known band in Japan's underground music scene in the 1980s and 1990s. Upon playing some concerts abroad he made several acquaintances with bands and people. These include The Damned, Patricia Morrison, Hanoi Rocks, The Cramps, Ramones, Johnny Thunders, Switchblade Symphony and others.

The Zolge disbanded in 1993, but Haruhiko Ash stayed active in various fields such as writing and fashion modeling in both Paris and Tokyo. Later, in 1998, the song "Desperado" was released in the Black Bible compilation from US label Cleopatra Records. This was Eve of Destiny's first recorded song.

=== Közi ===
Közi is the former guitarist of the popular Japanese visual kei band Malice Mizer. After they went on hiatus at the end of 2001, Közi joined Haruhiko Ash, whom he knew from times before Malice Mizer, and together they reformed the Eve of Destiny project. Later, Közi started a solo career, releasing several singles and albums.

== History ==
Shortly after the release of the Black Bible compilation, Eve of Destiny was invited to play at the Wave-Gotik-Treffen in Leipzig, Germany in 1999, where Haruhiko appeared together with several guest musicians. After this, years of silence followed. However around the time Malice Mizer disbanded Eve of Destiny was invited again, so in 2002 Haruhiko returned, now together with Közi (before this they only played two gigs at the Philippines). The concert was quite a success and they were also invited to New Zealand and Switzerland later that year. In 2003 they started to tour Europe regularly and played at several countries for then on, both at festivals and clubs. The band played its first concert in Japan in February, 2004 and it was followed by two more next year, but Europe remained their main target. They had some tracks in compilation CDs, appeared in a few gothic magazines and were looking for a record company. They finally signed to the German Celtic Circle Productions label, but unfortunately this turned out to be a bad choice. After postponing it for countless times the label finally released their debut mini-album called 'Nervous And Innocence' in 2005, but scandals followed, including the last-minute cancellation of a festival organized by the label and the CD was basically impossible to get. Soon afterwards even the label's website disappeared and the band decided to cancel their contract with them. Eve of Destiny played a few more gigs in Autumn, 2005, but after this even their website was not updated any more and it finally disappeared in 2006. Közi continued his solo career, but there is no news about Haruhiko Ash or about any future activity for Eve of Destiny.

Around September, 2007, a new website for the band and Haruhiko's company, Evil Boy Productions showed up, hinting at some kind of activity, but just a few months later, it disappeared without a trace.

== Discography ==
=== Nervous and Innocence ===
1. Nervous and Innocence
2. Garden for a Zealot
3. Mother
4. Logos
5. Dead or Alive (2002demo)
6. I.NO.RI. (ASTAN MIX)

=== Compilations ===
- V.A. 『The Curse Of The Damned - A Tribute To The Damned From Japan, ZilloScope CD,
- ASTAN vol.17 Sampler CD,
- OFF vol.1 Sampler CD,
- V.A the Black Bible,
- ASTAN vol.16 Sampler CD,
- X. Castle Party 2003 compilation CD

=== Contributions ===
Razed in Black-album "Damaged" I'll Damage You (Eve Of Destiny Mix)
