= Au Revoir (Malice Mizer song) =

Single by Malice Mizer

from the album Merveilles
- Released: December 3, 1997
- Genre: J-pop; pop rock
- Length: 15:13
- Label: Nippon Columbia
- Composer: Mana
- Lyricist: Gackt C.

Malice Mizer singles chronology
"Bel Air (Kūhaku no Shunkan no Naka de)" (1997)	"Au Revoir" (1997)	"Gekka no Yasōkyoku" (1998)

"Au Revoir" is the fourth single by Japanese visual kei rock band Malice Mizer, released by Nippon Columbia on December 3, 1997. It reached number 10 on the Oricon Singles Chart, selling 112,560 copies. It was the second single released from the Merveilles album.

== Summary ==
"Au Revoir" was composed by Mana, one of the band's guitarists. The song's lyrics were written by Gackt. The song's title—"Au Revoir"—meaning "goodbye" in French, was mean to recall an atmosphere of French Baroque. Edmund Yeo described the song as "violin-lashed" with "almost saloon-style piano refrains".

== Reception ==
The single reached number 10 and charted for a total of 11 weeks on the Oricon Singles Chart, becoming the band's third highest-charting single. It was the band's first entry into the top ten. It sold 112,560 copies.

== Music video ==
The music video included a montage of some Malice Mizer members pretending to play their instruments in unusual ways, juxtaposing an image with a contrasted musical sound. Közi was portrayed performing the violin solo by bowing his guitar with a wooden branch. Mana was filmed standing still with his guitar, and Kami was shown playing drums in slow motion. This was done to communicate the band's aesthetics of the transcendence of time. (Note: Source incorrectly names bassist Yu~ki as the one playing the violin solo.)

== Track listing ==
No.	Title	Lyrics	Music	Length
1.	"Au Revoir"	Gackt C.	Mana	4:53
2.	"Au Revoir (Bossa)"	Gackt C.	Mana	5:26
3.	"Au Revoir (Instrumental)"		Mana	4:54
Total length:				15:13
