= Merveilles (album) =

Studio album by Malice Mizer
- Released: March 18, 1998
- Recorded: 1997–1998
- Studios: Hitokuchizaka Studio; Recording Studio Soundvalley; Freedom Studio; Bunkamura Studio; Onkio Haus (mastered)
- Genres: Baroque pop; synthpop; art rock; dark cabaret
- Length: 47:39
- Label: Nippon Columbia
- Producer: Malice Mizer

Malice Mizer chronology
Voyage ~Sans Retour~ (1996)	Merveilles (1998)	Shinwa (2000)

Singles from Merveilles
- 1. "Bel Air" Released: July 19, 1997; 2. "Au Revoir" Released: December 3, 1997; 3. "Gekka no Yasōkyoku" Released: February 21, 1998; 4. "Illuminati" Released: May 20, 1998; 5. "Le Ciel" Released: September 30, 1998

Professional ratings
Review scores
Source	Rating
Sputnikmusic	5/5 stars

Merveilles (French for "Wonders") is the third studio album by Japanese rock band Malice Mizer, released on March 18, 1998 by Nippon Columbia. It is the band's only album on a major record label, their most commercially successful, reaching number two on the Oricon Albums Chart, as well as their last with second vocalist Gackt.

== Summary ==
Merveilles is the band's first album on a major record label, being released by Nippon Columbia. Its title was coined by vocalist Gackt as a keyword to the theme. Its overall concept is "a story that goes back and forth between the present, the past and the future across time". However, the lyrics are not set in the real world as it is, but in the fairy-tale world, the medieval world and the future world. This album marked the pinnacle of the band's success, being their best-selling album, charting high on the Oricon charts, and also earned them several national TV appearances. Japanese pop culture website Real Sound credited Malice Mizer as the first visual kei band to incorporate European aesthetics into heavy metal with the twin guitars in "Bel Air (Kūhaku no Toki no Naka de)". "Ēge (Sugisarishi Kaze to Tomo ni)" is a reworking of "Ēge Umi ni Sasagu" from their first album Memoire.

In 1998, the band played live at the Nippon Budokan which involved a large building as a stage prop and elaborate theatrics; each member performing a skit with another on their own (including a skit in which Gackt fell to the stage to sing the song "Le Ciel", and returned to "Heaven" by song's [and concert's] end). It was a success and was released on home video as Merveilles (Shūen to Kisū) l'espace. In July 1998, the band held their last live performance with Gackt at the Yokohama Arena, prior to the announcement of his departure in January 1999.

A few months after Gackt's departure, drummer Kami died of a subarachnoid hemorrhage on June 21. But the band continued to exist, as Kami was replaced by a non-official, supporting member, and new vocalist Klaha was recruited. By then the band had abandoned the lighter pop music sound of the Gackt era for a dramatic mixture of Baroque music, gothic, metal and electronic music, and adopted an elaborate funeral goth look.

== Release ==
Merveilles was released on March 18, 1998, by Columbia. In the fifth counting week of March it reached number two on the Oricon Albums Chart, with sales of 169,290 copies. In the first week of April it charted at number twelve, with sales of 41,900 copies. In total, the album charted for sixteen weeks, and sold over 307,450 copies.

The singles from Merveilles are the most successful in the band's history. The first press edition of "Bel Air" was initially released on July 19, 1997, and reached number twenty on the Oricon Singles Chart. The standard edition was released the following month, August 6, and peaked at number forty-two. Released on December 3, "Au Revoir" reached number ten, marking the band's first top ten entry, and charted for eleven weeks. The cumulative sales for both editions of "Bel Air" were 56,570 copies, while "Au Revoir" sold 112,560 copies. A month before the album's release, "Gekka no Yasōkyoku" was released on February 11, 1998 and became their best-selling single. It reached number eleven, charted for twelve weeks, and sold over 168,090 copies. It was later followed on May 20, 1998 by "Illuminati", which reached number seven and sold 117,410 copies. "Le Ciel" was released on September 30, 1998. In addition to being their highest-charting single, reaching number four, it sold 117,240 copies, was the band's only single written and composed by Gackt, and their last on a major record label.

In March 1998, Merveilles was certified Gold by the RIAJ for sales of over 200,000 copies. The single "Gekka no Yasōkyoku" followed in July 1998.

== Legacy ==
In 2004, it was named one of the top albums from 1989–1998 in an issue of the music magazine Band Yarouze. In 2021, Jamie Cansdale of Kerrang! included Merveilles on a list of 13 essential Japanese rock and metal albums. He wrote that with it, Malice Mizer embraced "antiquated piano and violin fanfare, resulting in symphonic ballads and avant-garde pomp heavier than anything on the airwaves at the time."

== Track listing ==
All lyrics are written by Gackt C.

Merveilles track listing
No.	Title	Music	Length
1.	"De Merveilles"	Mana	1:07
2.	"Syunikiss (Nidome no Aitō)" (Syunikiss〜二度目の哀悼〜; 'Syunikiss ~Second Lament~')	Yu~ki	4:14
3.	"Bel Air (Kūhaku no Toki no Naka de)" (ヴェル・エール～空白の瞬間(とき)の中で～; 'Bel Air ~In the Blank Time~')	Mana	5:34
4.	"Illuminati"	Közi	5:12
5.	"Brise"	Közi	5:03
6.	"Ēge (Sugisarishi Kaze to Tomo ni)" (エーゲ〜過ぎ去りし風と共に〜; 'Aegean ~With the Passing Wind~')	Mana	4:58
7.	"Au Revoir"	Mana	4:54
8.	"Je te Veux"	Közi	4:37
9.	"S-Conscious"	Mana	3:20
10.	"Le Ciel"	Gackt C.	5:00
11.	"Gekka no Yasōkyoku" (月下の夜想曲; 'Nocturne in the Moonlight')	Közi	3:45
12.	"Bois de Merveilles"	Malice Mizer	1:55

== Personnel ==
=== Malice Mizer ===
- Gackt - vocals, piano
- Közi - guitar, synthesizer
- Mana - guitar, synthesizer
- Yu~ki - bass
- Kami - drums, percussion
- Malice Mizer - arrangements, programming

=== Other personnel ===
- Masashi Abe - cello
- Chieko Kinbara - violin
- Toshihiro Nakanishi - violin
- Nobuhiko Nakayama - synthesizer programing, sound design
- Yohei Shimada - sound advisor, keyboards, arrangements

Production

- Producer: Malice Mizer
- Executive producer: Nobuhiko Miyazawa, Yukie Ito
- Engineers (additional): Hideyuki Hanaki, Hirohito Fujishima
- Recorded and mixed by Atsuo Akabae
- Mastered by Masao Nakazato

Design

- Art direction, cover collage, design: Teruhisa Abe
- Design: Hiroyuki Komagai, Takaaki Inoue
- Photography: Masatoshi Makino

== Charts ==
Chart performance for Merveilles
Chart (1998)	Peak position
Japanese Albums (Oricon)	2
