= Château d'Alincourt =

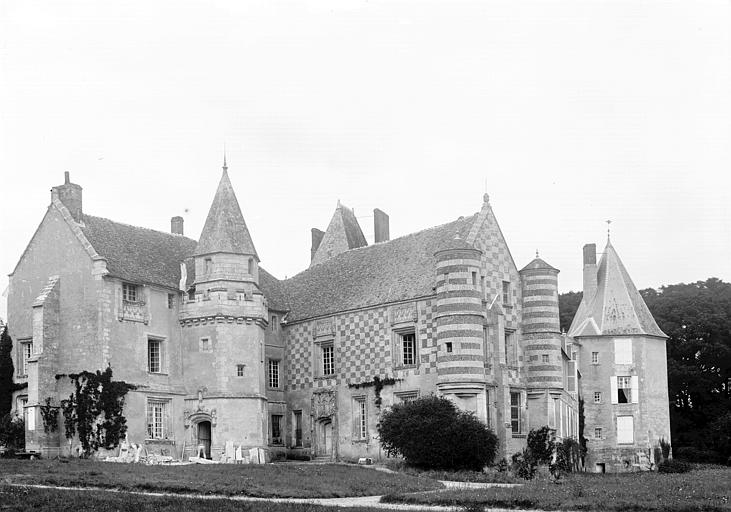
- Interactive map of the Château d'Alincourt area

General information
- Type: Château
- Location: Parnes, France
- Coordinates: 49.1862°N 1.7590°E
- Completed: 17th century

The Château d'Alincourt is a historic château in Parnes, Oise, France. It was built in the 17th century. It has been listed as an official historical monument since 1944.
