= Memoire (album) =

Studio album by Malice Mizer
- Released: July 24, 1994; December 24, 1994 (DX edition)
- Recorded: Triade, April 1994
- Genre: Gothic rock
- Length: 21:08; 28:27 (DX edition)
- Label: Midi:Nette
- Producer: Malice Mizer

Malice Mizer chronology
Memoire (1994)	Voyage Sans Retour (1996)

Memoire (French for "Memory") is the debut studio album by Japanese rock band Malice Mizer, released on July 24, 1994 by Midi:Nette. It is their only album with original vocalist Tetsu and was reissued on December 24, 1994 as Memoire DX.

== Overview ==
Memoire was given a limited release of 3,000 copies on July 24, 1994 by guitarist Mana's own record label, Midi:Nette. It is their only official material released with original vocalist Tetsu, besides "Speed of Desperate" for the 1993 omnibus Brain Trash. The album was reissued on December 24 of the same year as Memoire DX, containing an additional track and an expanded booklet. The cover illustration and the typography of the band's name, which would serve as the band's logo, were inspired by Mylène Farmer's album Ainsi soit je....

Mana said that for the album he used guitar synths to create violin and pipe organ sounds because at the time he found it more interesting than "rock guitar." He also said the technology was still in its early stages at the time, and he had trouble getting the timing right because the MIDI signal had a slight delay.

== Themes ==
Mana stated that the goal of the instrumental first track, "De Memoire", is to revive nostalgic memories. Fellow guitarist Közi revealed that they initially tried adding a bunch of different sounds, but ultimately decided that just the piano felt sad and lonely, like an Italian horror movie.

Bassist Yu~ki noted that "Kioku to Sora" is the oldest song on the album, and that he had trouble with a nuanced bass phrase that Mana wanted. Mana said that its tempo and beat steadily change, and called its rhythm really interesting. He said they added classical undertones and used a pipe organ for the melody. Drummer Kami said it starts with guitar playing a 4/4 beat, and they "dared" to mix in a 3/4 beat. He called it his favorite song. Közi felt it is the album's song that best shows Malice Mizer's classical gothic sound. They did not think to add the violin until the very end of making it. Lyricist Tetsu said that when he first heard the song it reminded him of when he was 10 years old and frightened of nuclear war due to films like Forbidden Games and Barefoot Gen and his grandfather's death. He wrote its lyrics with that feeling in mind, and the song is sung from the perspective of the dead man from their songs "Sadness" and "Zenchō".

Tetsu said that "Ēge Umi ni Sasagu" is about a girl on the Aegean seaside remembering a sad love from long ago. When he first heard it, Kami felt it was not like Malice Mizer at all. He said the atmospheric song was really difficult, but he now likes it a lot. Yu~ki focused less on his technique and more on adding nuances throughout. Közi called it his favorite song on Memoire. In the album booklet, the song is given the subtitle "~The Vault of Heaven~". "Ēge Umi ni Sasagu" was later drastically altered to become "Aegean (Sugisarishi Kaze to Tomo ni)" on the band's third album Merveilles.

Wanting to try something new, Mana gave "Gogo no Sasayaki" a bossa nova rhythm. Yu~ki said it has a live acoustic feel, and that he added effects to his bass for the latter half of the song. Kami assumed bossa nova would be easy, but said it was very difficult. Közi referred to the song as the "coffee break" when listening to the album.

Kami said he likes the strong chorus and aggressive vocals on "Miwaku no Rōma", and described it as very rhythmic. Közi said he had a hard time getting the sound of a real violin with his synth guitar. He described the violin part at the chorus as having a medieval European feel.

Wanting "Seraph" to sound unlike any other band out there, Közi said Malice Mizer added a lot to the song, and as a result it is the thickest sounding song on the album. They used synths to thicken the sound of Közi's guitar, but there are more keyboards and piano than synths. Tetsu said that "Seraph" tells the happy ending of the same man from "Kioku to Sora", but said he planned to continue the story in later songs.

== Reception ==
In a contemporary review for the special November 1995 Generation Edge issue of Rockin'f magazine, Fuzuki Watanabe described the music on Memoire as evocative of elegant European traditions and as having dramatic arrangements that conceal a sense of tenderness, but noted the album also contains a fresh and captivating bossa nova-styled track.

Writing a retrospective review for Mikiki, Naoko Kato described Memoire as primarily a rock album, albeit one with the addition of strings and other elements. Motohiro Maikaino of Re:minder concurred, describing "Kioku to Sora" as fusing pipe organs with a rock band sound while heavily incorporating gothic elements such as irregular time signatures and grandfather clock samples, and "Miwaku no Rōma" as blending violin arrangements with a "pop sensibility". But he cited "Baroque" as the album's best track; "a sprawling, seven-and-a-half-minute epic [...] incorporating elements such as shifting time signatures, waltzes and an interpolation of 'Für Elise', it stands as the definitive culmination of Malice Mizer's first era—a bold experiment in fusing rock music with classical traditions."

== Track listing ==
All lyrics are written by Tetsu; all music is composed by Mana, except track 6, music by Közi.

Memoire track listing
No.	Title	Length
1.	"De Memoire"	0:57
2.	"Kioku to Sora" (記憶と空; 'Memory and Sky')	4:48
3.	"Ēge Umi ni Sasagu" (エーゲ海に捧ぐ; 'Dedicated to the Aegean Sea')	5:09
4.	"Gogo no Sasayaki" (午後のささやき; 'Whispers in the Afternoon')	2:34
5.	"Miwaku no Rōma" (魅惑のローマ; 'Enchanted in Rome')	3:22
6.	"Seraph"	4:16
7.	"Baroque" (バロック; DX edition only)	7:19

== Personnel ==
=== Malice Mizer ===
- Tetsu – lead vocals, classical guitar on "Gogo no Sasayaki"
- Mana – synth guitar, synthesizer on "De Memoire"
- Közi – synth guitar, synthesizer on "Seraph"
- Yu~ki – bass
- Kami – drums, percussion

=== Other contributors ===
- E~da – female voice on track 2
- Miyuki Takahashi – sequence programmer
- Mr. Kokado – recording and mixing
