= Malice Mizer =

Japanese visual kei rock band

- Malice Mizer in 1998. Clockwise from top-left: Mana, Kami, Közi, Yu~ki, Gackt

Background information
- Origin: Japan
- Genres: Symphonic rock; gothic rock; neoclassical darkwave; synthpop
- Works: Malice Mizer discography
- Years active: 1992–2001; 2018 (Note: One-off reunions in 2010, 2012, 2014, and 2016)
- Labels: Nippon Columbia; Midi:Nette
- Past members: Mana; Közi; Yu~ki; Gaz; Tetsu; Kami; Gackt; Klaha
- Website: malice-mizer.co.jp
- Logo

Malice Mizer (stylized as MALICE MIZER) was a Japanese visual kei rock band active from 1992 to 2001. The band was notable for their music and their live shows, featuring lavish historical costumes and stage sets, with short silent theater pieces preluding various songs.

Formed by guitarists Mana and Közi, throughout their history, the band has gone through several different lineups and three drastic image changes, with Mana, Kozi, and bassist Yu~ki being the band's sole consistent members. Their earlier music and themes were characterized by their strong French and classical influences, later moving away from deliberate French romanticism and incorporating Gothic aspects after several difficulties befell the band.

At their peak in the mid-to-late 1990s, during the "Gackt era", they were considered one of the "Four Heavenly Kings of visual kei" alongside La'cryma Christi, Fanatic Crisis and Shazna. Their third and most successful studio album Merveilles (1998) was included in 2021 by Kerrang! on a list of 13 essential Japanese rock and metal albums. However, their success was short-lived, and in late 2001 it was announced that Malice Mizer would go on an indefinite hiatus. Mana, Közi and Yu~ki have performed together several times since 2010.

== History ==
=== 1992–1994: Tetsu era ===
After leaving Matenrou, guitarists Mana and Közi formed Malice Mizer in August 1992 with Tetsu on vocals, Yu~ki on bass and Gaz on drums. The band's name is coined from the phrase "Malice et Misère " (French for "malice and misery"), extracted from "Nothing but a being of malice and tragedy" — their reply to the question "What is a human being?" From the outset, the band established their trademark "twin guitar"' sound, whereby two guitars play different melodies creating polyphony. Malice Mizer's sound during the Tetsu era was a mixture of early 1980s gothic rock, progressive rock and strong classical influences. Their first official release was the song "Speed of Desperate" on the 1993 compilation Braintrash. Before this, they had released a demo tape called "Sans Logique" (a nod to French pop singer Mylène Farmer's hit song "Sans Logique") which contained no vocals. Shortly after the release of Braintrash, Gaz left the band to join Kneuklid Romance, while Kneuklid Romance's drummer Kami in turn joined Malice Mizer. In 1994, after a couple more demos, the band released their debut album Memoire on Mana's newly founded independent record label Midi:Nette. It was re-released at the end of the year with an additional bonus track, "Baroque", under the title Memoire DX. Only days later, singer and lyricist Tetsu left the band after his last gig on December 27, 1994. Due to creative differences and not wanting to be known across Japan for wearing makeup and extravagant costumes on stage, Tetsu went on to take a different direction in his work. The band's continued use of his lyrics in songs they continued to perform with later vocalists suggest an amicable split.

=== 1995–1998: Gackt era ===
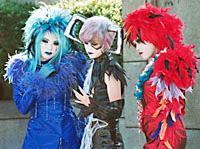
Fans cosplaying as Mana, Yu~ki and Közi in Shibuya, October 1998

After almost a year of inactivity, Malice Mizer recruited Gackt from the band Cains:Feel as their new vocalist, and had their first performance with him at Shibuya On Air West on October 10, 1995. They released their first single, "Uruwashiki Kamen no Shoutaijou", on December 10, 1995. It was with this single that Malice Mizer started to actively differentiate themselves from other bands; when the song was performed live, Mana and Közi put down their guitars and performed a dance choreography. In part due to Gackt's influence (who was also interested in the theme of "What is human?" before joining the band), the band developed their new concept. The band pivoted towards an art rock and synthpop sound, incorporating even stronger classical and electronic elements into their music. Visually, the band also abandoned their 1980s goth look for colorful historical costumes with gothic inspirations.

Malice Mizer released their second album, Voyage Sans Retour, in 1996. In 1997, they released their first home video, Sans Retour Voyage "Derniere" (Encore Une Fois), which was a concert recording at Shibuya Public Hall featuring an elaborate stage and dance routines. The band became increasingly popular and signed with major record label Nippon Columbia that same year, where they released a number of successful singles ("Bel Air", "Au Revoir", "Gekka no Yasōkyoku") as well as a short film, Bel Air (Kuuhaku no Toki no Naka de) de L'image. Their major label debut album, Merveilles, was released in March 1998. It was commercially and critically the band's most successful album, peaking at 2nd place on the Oricon Albums Chart and charting for 16 weeks. Both the album and its single "Gekka no Yasōkyoku" were certified Gold by the RIAJ for sales of over 200,000 copies. In May, the band released their single "Illuminati" which peaked at 7th place and sold over 100,000 copies. The band had their own radio show around this time and played a two-day live at the Nippon Budokan, which involved a large stage-prop building and elaborate theatrics; each member performed a skit with another member. The live was a massive success and was released on video as Merveilles (Shuuen to kisuu) l'espace. In July 1998, the Yokohama Arena show would come to be the band's last time performing with Gackt. In September 1998, the group released their most successful single yet, "Le Ciel". The song peaked at 4th place on the Oricon Singles Chart, selling over 100,000 copies.

In January 1999, at the seeming height of Malice Mizer's success, Gackt left the band and started a solo career. There were various rumours about the cause of his departure. In an October 1998 interview, Gackt complained about the slow progression of the band. In a February 1999 interview, Gackt claimed that his departure was primarily due to conflicts with the band's agency Midi:Nette, but that interpersonal conflicts, the sudden financial success, and his isolation from the band also played a part. He also claimed that it was the other members who refused to continue working with him during their last meeting with the record company, and that he was open to rejoining Malice Mizer if they invited him.

On the other hand, in March 1999 interview the band members stated that they lost contact with Gackt after their last meeting in November 1998. The band was now seeking a new vocalist. In regards to the split, the members called out Gackt's insistence on continuing band activities when they needed a break and the lack of a trusting relationship, but stated that they never expelled him from Malice Mizer. A February 2001 report, based on accounts of staff members who worked at the time with Malice Mizer, claimed that Gackt's departure was due to conflict with the president of Midi:Nette, Mana's close partner. The agency's mismanagement of band and fan club funds left members living in indie-days conditions, and the agency also failed to protect Gackt from paparazzi's harassment. Other members declined to speak up on these issues, and Gackt's decision to confront the office allegedly resulted in his departure.

=== 1999–2000: Kami's death ===
Malice Mizer left Nippon Columbia shortly after and returned to Midi:Nette (established as Midi:Nette M.†.M). Kami died of a subarachnoid hemorrhage on June 21, 1999. He left behind a handful of songs, which the band eventually released as part of the EP/video boxset Shinwa, which consists of two songs composed by him and the short track "Saikai" written by the band. Kami was never officially replaced; from that point on, Malice Mizer would only use support drummers (namely ex-Aion member Shu, who is not shown in the band's later promotional material, nor credited) and Kami would be credited as "eternal blood relative" on all their future releases. In the second half of 1999 and the beginning of 2000, Malice Mizer, still without an official vocalist, released a number of singles and began to work on a new album.

=== 2000–2001: Klaha era ===
Eventually, the band recruited Klaha (vocalist of dark wave band Pride of Mind), officially inducting him into the band as a full member in August 2000. By then, the band had abandoned the lighter pop music sound of the Gackt era for a dramatic mixture of classical music and dark wave, with slight heavy metal elements, and adopted an elaborate funerary elegant gothic look. In the summer of 2000, they released what would be their last album, Bara no Seidou, which peaked at 17th place on the charts, selling only 22,000 copies. On August 31 and September 1, they gave a theatrical two-day live at the Nippon Budokan, featuring pyrotechnics, a choir of veiled nuns and a scaled-down cathedral as a stage prop. In 2001, Malice Mizer starred in a feature-length vampire movie (Bara no Konrei (Mayonaka ni Kawashita Yakusoku)) and released three more singles: "Gardenia", "Beast of Blood" and "Garnet ~Kindan no Sono e~"; "Gardenia" and "Garnet" had a considerably lighter tone than their previous album, suggesting another new era for the band. However, the band members decided to go their own separate ways in 2001, leaving messages on their official website. The split was referred to as a "hiatus", so as not to exclude the possibility of a future reformation.

=== Post projects ===
After his departure in 1994, Tetsu released one solo album, and has subsequently taken part in a series of bands such as Zigzo, Mega 8 Ball, and Nil, with his most recent being The JuneJulyAugust. After his departure in early 1999, Gackt started a solo career a year later which has been enormously successful, becoming one of Japan's top solo artists and TV personalities.

Klaha started a solo career as well in December 2002, but in the middle of 2004 it was announced that his fan club would be closing down, and after that there have been long periods of silence, only broken by rare updates on his site. In 2007, he stated on his site that he would resume musical activity that year. However, this did not happen and no information has been announced since. Yu~ki has not been active on the music scene since 2004 when he wrote the song "Memento", about Kami, for Közi's solo project. In an informal conversation with Klaha, he said he would like to return to the music scene. Közi formed the industrial duo Eve of Destiny with Haruhiko Ash (ex:The Zolge) and also started a solo career. From 2008 to 2022, he was part of the band Dalle. Around June 2010, Közi started to perform with a band called My Horror Revue. He has also formed the band XA-VAT, who held their first performance on November 16, 2010 and released their first single on December 2. In 2012, he formed the band ZIZ with the musicians who supported him with his solo career. In 2025, Közi and Hora formed the duo Mayohk.

In 2002, Mana formed his own solo project Moi dix Mois, which has performed live concerts across Europe. In addition to the successful solo project, Mana is a designer for his fashion label Moi-même-Moitié (founded in 1999), which specializes in Elegant Gothic Aristocrat and Elegant Gothic Lolita styles. He also continues to run his indie record label Midi:Nette, and has produced for artists such as Schwarz Stein and Kanon Wakeshima.

Malice Mizer's song "Gekka no Yasōkyoku" was covered by D on the compilation Crush! -90's V-Rock Best Hit Cover Songs-, which was released on January 26, 2011 and features modern visual kei bands covering songs from bands that were important to the '90s visual kei movement. Their song "Illuminati" was covered by Moran on its sequel, Crush! 2 -90's V-Rock Best Hit Cover Songs-, that was released on November 23, 2011.

Original drummer Gaz died on December 22, 2017, due to illness.

=== Deep Sanctuary reunions ===
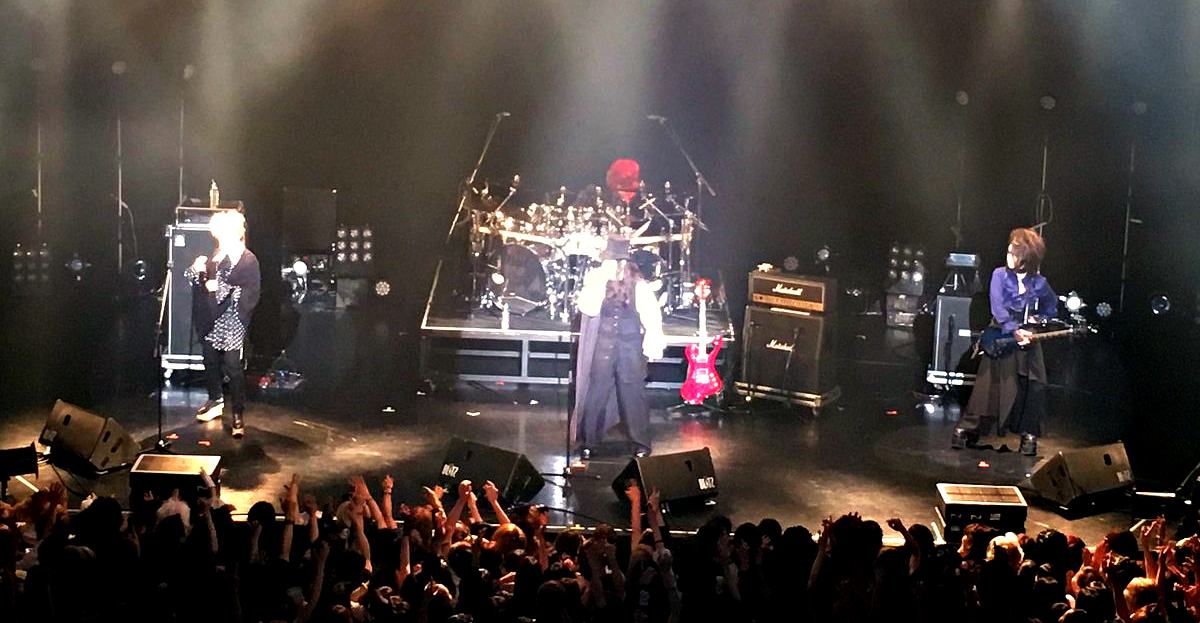
Közi, Yu~ki and Mana performing together at the Deep Sanctuary V event in 2016.

Since 2008, Mana's band Moi dix Mois has held a special event, most taking place every two years, which has had some sort of connection to Malice Mizer. The first was Dis Inferno Vol.VI: Last Year Party on December 27, 2008, where Malice Mizer's "Speed of Desperate" was played in a session by Mana on drums, Közi on guitar and Mana's cousin Katsuo U.K (カツヲU.K) on vocals. Közi said that this was the first time he and Mana had met since 2001. In 2009, Moi dix Mois and Közi went on a short two-date tour called Deep Sanctuary, on July 17 in Osaka and the 19th in Tokyo.

A year later in July 2010, Közi once again went on a tour with Moi dix Mois, titled Deep Sanctuary II. This tour had six shows, but the gig at Akasaka Blitz on the 17th was special, as Yu~ki was a special guest. This was the first time in 9 years that the three original members of Malice Mizer played together, and they were supported by Hayato (Moi dix Mois) on drums. They played "Saikai no Chi to Bara" and "Beast of Blood", as well as a cover of Rob Zombie's "What Lurks on Channel X?". In 2012, the three played together twice more for Deep Sanctuary III; once on September 12 at Akasaka Blitz and again on November 14, 2012 at Osaka Muse Hall.

In 2014, another reunion of the three original members happened for Deep Sanctuary IV at Akasaka Blitz on October 11. This marked the first time they performed under the Malice Mizer name since 2001. It was followed by Deep Sanctuary V at Akasaka Blitz on August 7, 2016. On September 8 and 9, 2018, Mana, Közi, and Yu~ki reunited as Malice Mizer to perform two shows for the band's 25th anniversary special at Tokyo Toyosu Pit. Titled Deep Sanctuary VI, Moi dix Mois and ZIZ also performed. They were supported on drums by Sakura, who was Kami's drum mentor, and who used Kami's original drum kit for the show. Mana tried reaching out to Tetsu, Gackt and Klaha regarding their participation, but the first two declined "for various reasons, such as their current musical stances being different", and he was unable to reach the third. Instead, the band's former roadies Shuji (Cali Gari), Kamijo, and Hitomi filled in as guest vocalists. A Blu-ray of the concert was released on June 21, 2019.

Deep Sanctuary VII was scheduled to take place at Mynavi Blitz Akasaka on June 7, 2020, but was cancelled due to the COVID-19 pandemic in Japan. No new Deep Sanctuary shows have been held as of 2025.

== Musical style and influences ==
"Sadness ~I Know the Reason for Her Sadness~"
A gothic rock song from the "Sadness" demo tape. One of Malice Mizer's first songs, with Tetsu as the vocalist.

"Au Revoir"
One of Malice Mizer's most successful singles from the Merveilles album with Gackt. A nostalgic pop song.

"Beast of Blood"
One of Malice Mizer's final songs with Klaha. Organ and harpsichord arpeggios overlaid with metal power chords and a pop-styled chorus.

Throughout its existence, Malice Mizer went through several major changes to their image and sound. AllMusic author Alexey Eremenko wrote that the band's music "incorporated elements from dark wave, metal, techno, classical music, synth-pop, and early gothic rock", while maintaining a commercial aim. Mana stated that Malice Mizer's music draws its roots from his childhood, specifically, being greatly scared by the opening theme music of Doyou Waido Gekijou. He has also cited Johann Sebastian Bach as a big influence, specifically mentioning how Bach's concertos for two harpsichords influenced his and Közi's guitar playing in the band. Mana wanted to imitate harpsichords, and so the two guitarists play separate melodies, do not harmonize, and never utilize bends or choking.

In the first years of the band's activity, their music and image were characterized by being strongly influenced by French romanticism. Since the band's foundation, they incorporated their signature "twin guitar" sound into their songs. Malice Mizer's sound during the so-called "Tetsu era" has been described as a combination of rock and early 1980s goth with "strong classical influences".

Following the departure of Tetsu and the recruitment of Gackt, the band's sound gained major influences from progressive rock and incorporated more visible elements of art and classical music, as well as electronic music, Baroque music, French pop, and dark wave.

On the Bara no Seidou album, with Klaha as the vocalist, Malice Mizer's music started incorporating traditional heavy metal tropes, such as power chords and "aggressive gravelly-voiced vocals". Elements of dark orchestral music, such as a pipe organ, harpsichord, string arrangements, choir, and "quasi-operatic vocals", were also present. "Beast of Blood", one of the band's last singles, is a fusion of three musical styles: classical, metal, and pop, with organ and harpsichord arpeggios overlaid with metal power chords and a "J-pop style chorus".

Lyrics to the band's songs are written primarily in Japanese, but also interweave English and French. They tend to be pessimistic, focused on the dark shades of human existence, exploring the themes of malice, tragedy, loss, and death. A common trope in the band's lyrics, present, for example, in "Beast of Blood", was vampirism.

Malice Mizer is considered to be one of the most influential visual kei bands, following the initial success of acts such as X Japan. Music website Barks wrote that after Mana and Malice Mizer, the number of visual kei bands with onnagata members increased. Musicians influenced or inspired by Malice Mizer include Golden Bomber, Matenrou Opera, Kamijo of Lareine and Versailles, and Nightmare guitarist Sakito. Dir En Grey drummer Shinya, who cited Kami as one of the three greatest Japanese drummers, was inspired by Malice Mizer to form his side project Seraph.

== Members ==
Former members

- Mana – guitar, keyboards, synthesizers, percussion (1992–2001, 2010, 2012, 2014, 2016, 2018)
- Közi – guitar, keyboards, synthesizers, percussion, backing vocals, occasional cello (1992–2001, 2010, 2012, 2014, 2016, 2018)
- Yu~ki – bass, contrabass, percussion (1992–2001, 2010, 2012, 2014, 2016, 2018)
- Gaz – drums (1992–1993; died 2017)
- Tetsu – lead vocals, occasional guitar (1992–1994)
- Kami – drums (1993–1999; his death) (Note: After his death, the band listed Kami on all subsequent releases as "eternal blood relative.")
- Gackt – lead vocals, piano (1995–1999)
- Klaha – lead vocals (2000–2001)

Support members

- Shu "Shue" Sakai – drums (2000–2001)
- Kazune – keyboards, synthesizers (2000–2001)
- Hayato – drums (2010, 2012, 2014, 2016)
- Sakura – drums (2018)

== Discography ==
Studio albums

- Memoire (1994)
- Voyage Sans Retour (1996)
- Merveilles (1998)
- Bara no Seidou (2000)
