= Kami (musician) =

- Promotional photograph of Kami

Background information
- Born: Ukyō Kamimura (神村 右京); February 1, 1972; Ibaraki, Japan
- Died: June 21, 1999 (aged 27) Kyoto, Japan
- Genres: Progressive rock; art rock; gothic rock; punk rock
- Occupation: Musician
- Instrument: Drums
- Years active: 1989–1999
- Labels: Nippon Columbia; Midi:Nette
- Formerly of: Kneuklid Romance; Malice Mizer

Ukyou Kamimura (神村 右京, Kamimura Ukyō; February 1, 1972 – June 21, 1999), better known by his stage name Kami, was a Japanese musician best known as visual kei rock band Malice Mizer’s drummer. He died on June 21, 1999, in his sleep of a subarachnoid hemorrhage at the age of 27. Dir En Grey drummer Shinya cited Kami as one of the three greatest Japanese drummers.

== Biography ==
=== Early life ===
Kami was born in the city of Ibaraki, Japan, on February 1, 1972. As a child in elementary school, he was very much interested in traditional Japanese brush writing and using a soroban (abacus), therefore studying these fondly. His first interest in playing his own tunes was in his fifth year at school when he began to practice on a drum kit. Kami left and didn't return to drumming until early high school. Early influences of Kami included many of the British new wave bands, including Culture Club and Duran Duran. Between this time, Kami devoted his after-school hours to practicing his favorite hobby, tennis, as he was fond of exercise.

=== Music career ===
At the beginning of his high school years, Kami was invited into a friend's band. Initially, his interest was in being a guitarist; after practicing for a short time, he decided to return to the drums. At some point, Sakura became his drum mentor.

Kami's fondness for drumming began to evolve, and a personal drum kit became a necessity. Thus, he took up a part-time job and subsequently saved up the necessary money. Realizing that he could not achieve a large amount of success in his current high school band after graduation, Kami decided to go to Tokyo. Upon leaving his previous group and moving, Kami spent a brief time in a punk band before taking a liking to the visual kei style. As a result, he joined an up-and-coming musical group called Kneuklid Romance. Performing mainly live shows, Kami soon attracted the attention of Yu~ki, bassist from the visual kei rock band Malice Mizer. Due to Malice Mizer's previous drummer, Gaz, leaving (who would shortly thereafter join Kneuklid Romance), the band was very keen on introducing Kami to their style of music. He was reluctant at first although a phone call from one of their guitarists, Mana, persuaded him. Therefore, Kami began to play unofficially for the band over six months as a support player. However, soon after, the other members of Malice Mizer agreed upon recruiting him as a full member of the group. Upon Kami's recruitment, Malice Mizer released their debut album, Memoire, his first inclusion on a publicly released album.

=== Death ===
On June 21, 1999, at age 27, Kami died in his sleep from a subarachnoid haemorrhage at his home in Kyoto. His body was discovered four days later, with his funeral being held that day. Only his band members, Mana, Közi, and Yu~ki were in attendance, as well as his parents and a few close friends. Gackt, who had just launched his solo career, was on tour at the time and did not learn of Kami's death until about a week later.

In the months before his death, Kami had been composing music, including "Unmei no Deai" and "Mori no Naka no Tenshi". These would later be released on the Malice Mizer EP, Shinwa, which is dedicated to Kami. He also left the incomplete song, "Bara no Souretsu", which was released on their "Beast of Blood" single. Malice Mizer's "Saikai no Chi to Bara" was written by Mana for Kami after his death.

As for the other members of Malice Mizer, Gackt wrote two songs in memory of Kami that were both released on his Mars album: "Emu ~For My Dear~" and "U+K". Közi and Yu~ki co-wrote Közi's solo single, "Memento," and dedicated it to Kami. Mana has also stated that one of the songs in his Moi dix Mois album, Nocturnal Opera, is dedicated to him.

=== Personal life ===
One of Kami's most popular trademarks was his hair, which had grown so long that he could actually sit on it. However, in 1998 he cut it off and changed his hairstyle. He constantly claimed that this was because his hair always got in the way while drumming. Kami had many hobbies and interests, such as tennis and buying lottery tickets. He was interested in Takeda Shingen and attended the Takeda Shingen Festival every year. He had a fondness for butterflies which can be found in many pictures and the "Au Revoir" music video.

== Band history ==
- 3PMayonnaise (3Pマヨネーズ) – 1989–1991
- Kneuklid Romance – September 1992 – March 1993
- Malice Mizer – March 17, 1993 – June 21, 1999
