= Gekka no Yasōkyoku (song) =

Single by Malice Mizer

from the album Merveilles
- Released: February 11, 1998
- Genre: Art rock
- Length: 11:19
- Label: Nippon Columbia
- Composer: Közi
- Lyricist: Gackt C.

Malice Mizer singles chronology
"Au Revoir" (1997)	"Gekka no Yasōkyoku" (1998)	"Illuminati" (1998)

"Gekka no Yasōkyoku" (Japanese: 月下の夜想曲; "Nocturne in the Moonlight") is the fifth single by Japanese visual kei rock band Malice Mizer, released by Nippon Columbia on February 11, 1998. It reached number 11 on the Oricon Singles Chart, selling 168,090 copies, and was certified Gold by the RIAJ. It was the third single released from the Merveilles album.

== Summary ==
"Gekka no Yasōkyoku" was composed by Közi, one of the band's guitarists. On Közi's request, Coba recorded the accordion part of the song. The song's lyrics, written by Gackt, tell a fairy tale-like story of two lovers whose souls were trapped in dolls. While performing the song, guitarists Mana and Közi would leave their instruments behind and enact a dance routine.

== Reception ==
The single reached number 11 and charted for a total of 12 weeks on the Oricon Singles Chart. It sold 168,090 copies, becoming the band's best-selling single. The single was certified Gold by the RIAJ. "Gekka no Yasōkyoku" was used as an ending theme for the TBS Television show Egawa no Shokutaku (江川の食卓) in 1998. It also served as an ending theme for Winning Keiba (ウイニング競馬) in December 2023.

== Track listing ==
No.	Title	Lyrics	Music	Length
1.	"Gekka no Yasōkyoku (月下の夜想曲)"	Gackt C.	Közi	3:46
2.	"Gekka no Yasōkyoku de l'image (月下の夜想曲 de l'image)"	Gackt C.	Közi	3:50
3.	"Gekka no Yasōkyoku (Instrumental) (月下の夜想曲 (Instrumental))"		Közi	3:43
Total length:				11:19

== Covers ==
Malice Mizer's "Gekka no Yasōkyoku" was covered by D on the compilation album Crush! -90's V-Rock Best Hit Cover Songs-. The album was released on January 26, 2011, and features current visual kei bands covering songs from bands that were important to the 1990s visual kei movement. In 2013, the song was covered by Misaruka.
