= Akasaka Blitz =

Music venue in Minato, Tokyo, Japan

Coordinates: 35°40′21″N 139°44′07″E

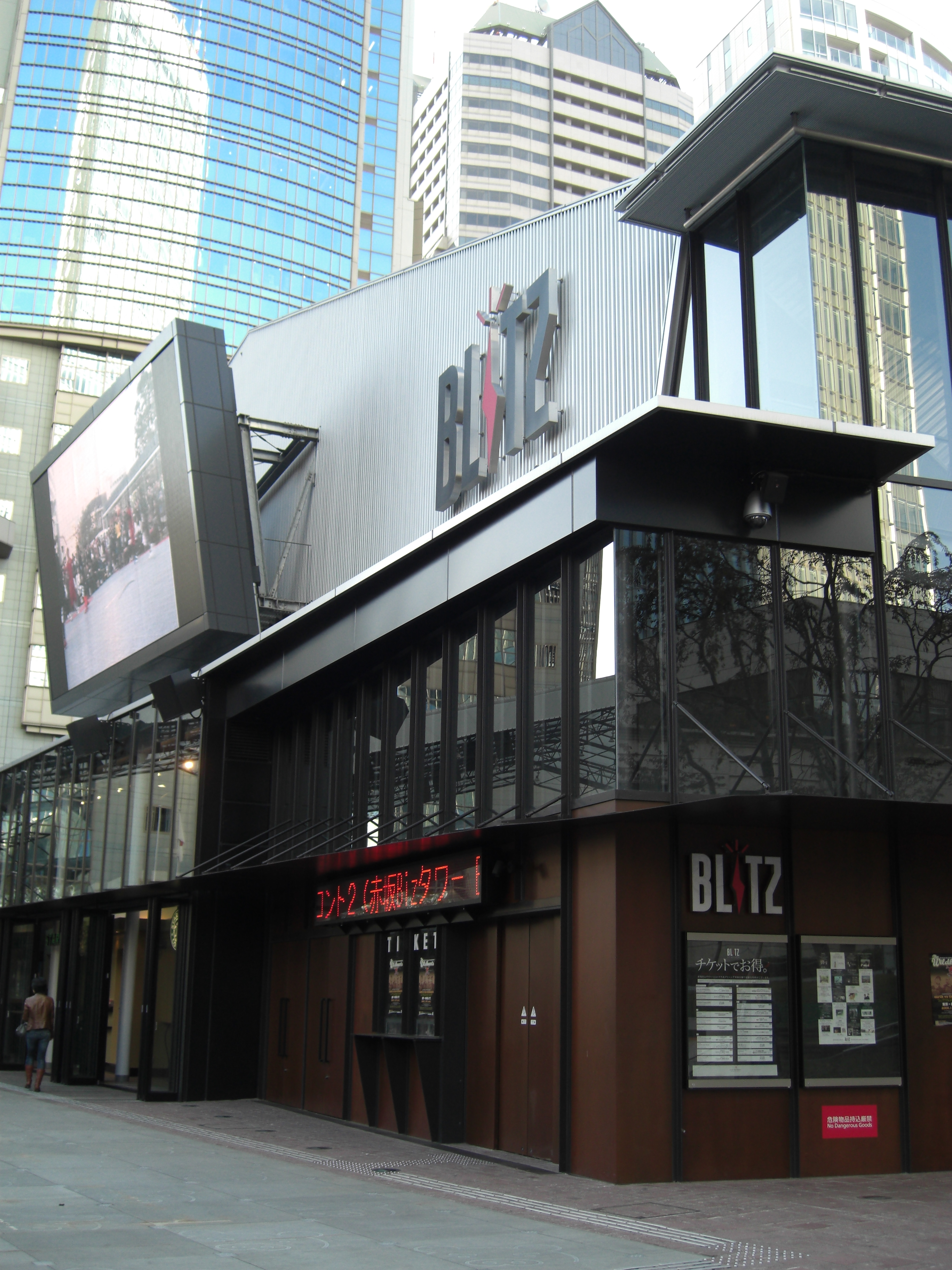
- Akasaka Blitz
- Interactive map of Akasaka Blitz
- Address: Akasaka-Sacas, 5-3-2 Akasaka 5-3-2, Minato, Tokyo; Japan
- Owner: Tokyo Broadcasting System Television, Inc.
- Capacity: 1,298 (all standing); 604 (all seated)

Construction
- Opened: April 1996
- Closed: September 22, 2020 (Permanently)
- Rebuilt: March 20, 2008

Website
- www.tbs.co.jp/blitz

Akasaka Blitz (赤坂BLITZ) was a music venue in Minato, Tokyo, which opened in April 1996, and was owned and operated by Tokyo Broadcasting System Television, Inc. On September 22, 2020, the venue was permanently shut down due to COVID-19. As part of a redevelopment plan that involved the demolition of several TBS buildings in the area, it closed from 2003 until its reopening on March 20, 2008. Since the naming rights were acquired by the Mynavi Corporation, the venue has been known as Mynavi Blitz Akasaka (マイナビBLITZ赤坂) since November 2017. Fishmans' final concert was performed here.
