= Közi =

Japanese musician

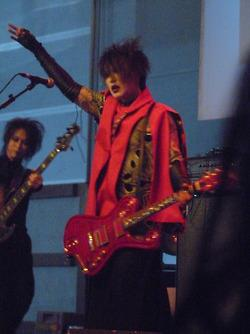
- Közi performing in France, 2011

Background information
- Born: May 29, 1972 (age 54); Niigata, Japan
- Origin: Tokyo
- Genres: Electronic rock; synthpop; ambient; gothic rock; industrial rock; neoclassical dark wave
- Occupations: Musician; singer-songwriter; DJ
- Instruments: Guitar; bass; keyboards; cello; percussion; vocals
- Years active: 1989–present
- Member of: XA-VAT; ZIZ; Vamquet; Mayohk
- Formerly of: Beyond The Rein Sight; Girl; Matenrou; Malice Mizer; Eve of Destiny; Dälle

Közi (born May 29, 1972) is a Japanese musician, singer-songwriter and DJ. He is best known as one of the guitarists for the 1990s visual kei rock band Malice Mizer. After they went on indefinite hiatus in 2001, he formed the industrial rock duo Eve of Destiny and also started a solo career. Közi is currently in the bands XA-VAT, ZIZ, Vamquet, and Mayohk, while occasionally performing solo shows.

During his time in Malice Mizer, Közi often assumed the role of a pierrot doll, dressing in clown-like costumes with large ruffs, always in shades of red, his favorite color. In music videos and on-stage he would often make movements reminiscent of a marionette. Közi has continued this visual style to some extent, but his contemporary stage costumes are more gothic. His work on the Izayoi no Tsuki project was reminiscent of carnival music, and artwork for his projects usually follow a dramatic, theatrical theme.

== Early life ==
Közi first learned to play bass guitar because everyone else had wanted to play guitar. But after seeing guitarist Seiji Watanabe play songs by Los Angeles heavy metal bands like Mötley Crüe and Ratt, he began dabbling in guitar and wanted to form his own band. He performed bass, and occasionally vocals due to revolving lineups, in many cover bands around his hometown in Niigata. He started playing guitar when he moved to Tokyo at eighteen years of age.

== Career ==
Közi's career began in 1989 at 17 years old in the underground band Beyond the Rein Sight, and, later, as a member of Girl. In late 1991, he joined Matenrou (摩天楼; "Skyscraper") with Mana. The two first met at a karaoke bar that Közi worked at. Közi and Mana left Matenrou after deciding they both had similar ideas about creating music, they formed Malice Mizer in 1992. He composed some of Malice Mizer's most successful songs, including their two best-selling singles: "Gekka no Yasōkyoku" and "Illuminati". After Malice Mizer disbanded in 2001, Közi joined Haruhiko Ash (from The Zolge) and created Eve of Destiny, an industrial rock band that toured outside Japan several times.

In 2002, Közi collaborated with Japanese author Minako, to provide the soundtrack to her book, Izayoi no Tsuki. He then performed a special singing event, which cemented the fact that he was following a solo career. Közi's first solo release was the two-disc, double-single package, "Khaos/Kinema", released on November 1, 2003. On March 11, 2004, he released his debut album, Catharsis. Közi's second single, "Memento", was released on December 1, 2004. The song is dedicated to deceased Malice Mizer drummer Kami and was written by Malice Mizer bassist Yu~ki. On May 17, 2006, Közi released his second album, Loki N' Roll.

Former Deadman frontman Mako released a photo book called Buried Alive by Words on May 29, 2008, which came with a CD of a song called "Buried with the Light" that features Közi on guitar and bass. On September 22, 2008, Közi joined the punk rock band Dälle, which consisted of Satoshi on vocals, Atsushi Hatta (Deep) on bass, Fuchi on drums, and Közi on guitar. The band played its first live on October 18 at Shinjuku Marz during the Tokyo Dark Castle ~ Halloween Special event, which also featured Auto-Mod and Aural Vampire. However, due to a five year hiatus and member changes, they did not have their first release until 2015. As of 2017, the group consisted of Közi, Atsushi, vocalist Ryo (Hollowgram) and Rieu on keyboards. Following numerous singles, Dälle released their first album, Ambivalence to Violenta, at the end of 2017. Közi left Dälle after a concert on June 4, 2022.

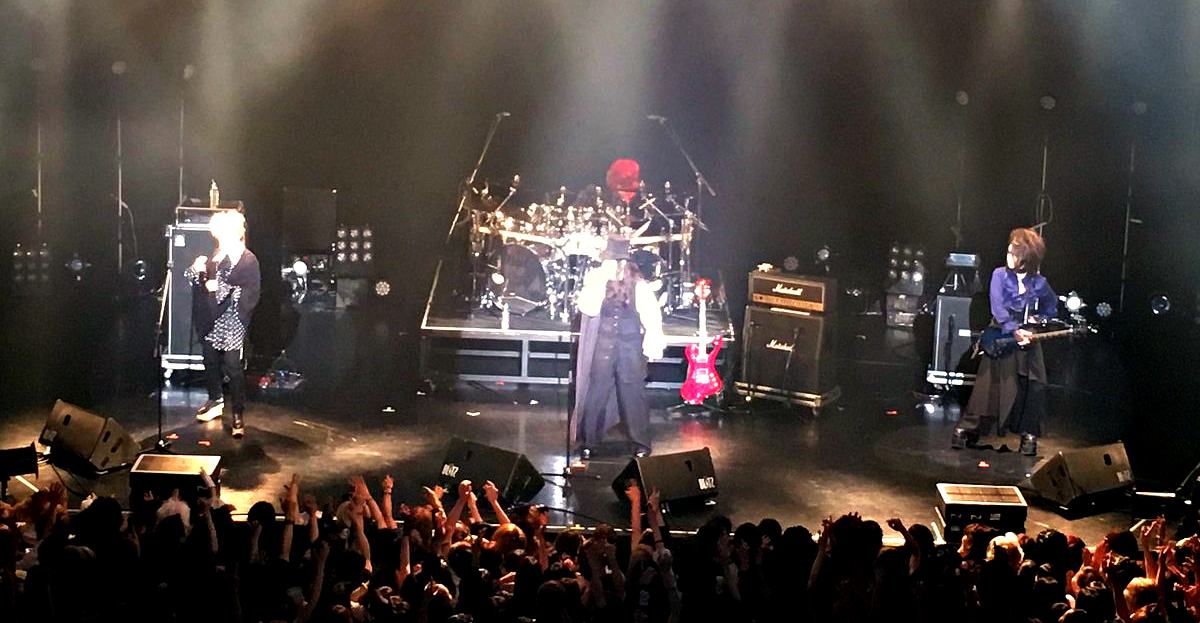
Közi (left) performing at Deep Sanctuary V in 2016.

On December 27, 2008, Közi played on stage with his former Malice Mizer band mate Mana's solo project, Moi dix Mois, for a session gig at their Dis Inferno Vol.VI ~Last Year Party~ event. In 2009, he went on a short coupling tour with Moi dix Mois called Deep Sanctuary, on July 17 in Osaka and July 19 in Tokyo. A year later, in July 2010, Közi went on another tour with Moi dix Mois, titled Deep Sanctuary II. This tour had six shows, with Malice Mizer bassist Yu~ki joining as a special guest at the Akasaka Blitz gig on July 17. This was the first time in nine years that the three remaining original members played together. The trio have performed together at the event several times since.

Around June 2010, Közi started to perform with a band called My Horror Revue. He also formed the band XA-VAT (ザバット, Zabatto), with Shuji Ishii (Cali Gari, Goatbed) on vocals, Takao Koma (Goatbed) on drums, Sadie Pink Galaxy (Speecies) on rhythm guitar and Közi on lead guitar. They held their first performance on November 16, 2010 and released their first self-titled single on December 2. They released their debut album Tsuya°C on March 26, 2011 in two limited editions, one with a live DVD, the other with a remix CD, and a regular edition. Following a hiatus that began in 2013, XA-VAT resumed activities in 2018 and released the mini-album K-I-S.

Közi performed in Paris at Porte de Versailles on April 9 and 10, 2011, with guest Miyu from Royal Cabaret. He planned to go to Moscow with The Candy Spooky Theater and Velvet Eden for a Halloween concert, however, it was moved and took place in Japan. In 2012 he formed the band ZIZ (ズィズ), composed of his backing band from his solo career; with himself as vocalist and guitarist, bassist Sugiya (Moi dix Mois), guitarist Jiro (Bioactive), keyboardist Yugami (Yugami Hakase) and drummer Chargeeeeee... (Omega Dripp). Their first album, Gift, was released on May 29 and a collaborative EP with Ken Morioka followed on December 28. ZIZ released their second album, Neighboring Chaosmos, on December 12, 2014.

In 2016, he formed the trio Vamquet with Sadie Pink Galaxy and Kai (Art Marju Duchain). They released their first album on November 23. Also in 2016, ZIZ released an EP titled JEEZSO8DOVEDOPE. It was followed by two more EPs: TEZLMOZL No.5 in 2017 and Liquid Stunt Flavor in 2018. On September 8 and 9, 2018, Mana, Közi, and Yu~ki reunited as Malice Mizer to perform two shows for the band's 25th anniversary special at Tokyo Toyosu Pit. In 2020, ZIZ released their Wabiy ∞ Sabiy album. On July 28, 2023, they released Shinjuu (十十). In 2025, Közi and Hora (Schwarz Stein) formed a duo under the name Mayohk.

== Discography ==
=== Solo ===
Albums

- Izayoi no Tsuki (十六夜の月; December 13, 2002, soundtrack)
- Catharsis (カタルシス; March 11, 2004)
- Loki N' Roll (May 17, 2006)

Singles

- "Khaos/Kinema" (November 1, 2003)
- "Memento" (December 1, 2004)

DVD

- Live Collage 2004~2006 (May 29, 2007)

=== Malice Mizer ===
- Memoire (1994)
- Voyage Sans Retour (1996)
- Merveilles (1998)
- Bara no Seidou (2000)

=== XA-VAT ===
- "XA-VAT" (December 2, 2010), Oricon Singles Chart Peak Position: #49
- Tsuya °C (艶°C; March 16, 2011), Oricon Albums Chart Peak Position: #71
- K-I-S (July 28, 2018)
- Geimu (芸夢; May 27, 2020)

=== ZIZ ===
- Gift (May 29, 2012)
- "Omiyage" (July 21, 2012, limited release sold at Tour du Détester Final concert) – with Monica Urangrass and PlasticZooms
- Salon du Détester (December 28, 2012, EP) – with Ken Morioka
- Neighboring Chaosmos (December 12, 2014)
- Jeez SO8 Dove Dope (May 29, 2016, EP)
- TEZL MOZL No. 5 (テヅルモヅルNo.5; May 26, 2017, EP)
- Liquid Stunt Flavor (August 25, 2018, EP)
- WABIY ∞ SABIY (May 29, 2020)
- 十十 (July 28, 2023)

=== Dälle ===
- "Fences" (December 2, 2015)
- "Asphalt" (February 25, 2016)
- "Witch Craft Pictures" (May 6, 2016)
- "Loyalty" (July 29, 2016)
- "ICU" (October 18, 2016)
- "Metaphor" (February 11, 2017)
- "A All End Sex" (April 9, 2017) – split single with EX-ANS
- "Owaru Sekai to Sayonara Heavenly" (終わる世界とさよならヘヴンリー; June 24, 2017)
- "Summer Sadness" (August 18, 2017)
- "Breathe Lost and Lust" (呼吸するLOST AND LUST; November 10, 2017)
- Ambivalence to Violenta (December 16, 2016)
- "Not in Love" (February 23, 2018)
- Destroyed to Discord, and the Reason (January 30, 2019)
- Lola Zaza Crowley (March 26, 2021)
- CLASSIX MMXV to MMXXII (May 29, 2022, compilation album)

=== Vamquet ===
- Vamhaus (November 23, 2016)
- "Eternal Shine" (March 23, 2018)
