= Mana (musician) =

Japanese musician, record producer and fashion designer

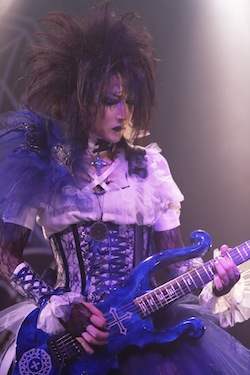
- Mana performing with Moi dix Mois in 2011

Background information
- Also known as: Serina
- Born: March 19; Hiroshima, Japan
- Genres: Gothic metal; industrial metal; neoclassical dark wave; synthpop; punk rock
- Occupations: Musician; songwriter; record producer; fashion designer; model
- Instruments: Guitar; keyboards; bass; drums
- Years active: 1986–present
- Label: Midi:Nette
- Member of: Moi dix Mois
- Formerly of: Malice Mizer
- Website: Monologue†Garden 独白の庭

Mana (Japanese: まな, 魔名) is a Japanese musician, songwriter, record producer, and fashion designer, best known as guitarist of the visual kei rock band Malice Mizer from their formation in 1992 until their indefinite hiatus in 2001. A year later, Mana formed the gothic metal band Moi dix Mois as his solo project.

Mana founded the independent record label Midi:Nette in 1994. In addition to signing electronic music duo Schwarz Stein, it has released the majority of Malice Mizer's musical output and all of Moi dix Mois' material as well as 2 albums and 2 singles by Kanon Wakeshima. His clothing label, Moi-même-Moitié, was established in 1999 and is credited with helping popularize the Gothic Lolita fashion movement.

== Early life ==
Mana was born in Hiroshima. His real name is not known publicly. Mana is a stage name, and is sometimes written with the kanji 魔名, which reads "evil name" or "devil's name". His fans refer to him as Mana-sama. At an early age, he was introduced to classical music by his parents, who were both music teachers. As a child, he listened to nothing but metal music.

Mana started playing in bands when he was in high school, with his first two live performances being as vocalist. Inspired by Mötley Crüe and their drummer Tommy Lee, he switched from vocals to double-bass drums. As a teenager he had an aversion to all things "girly" and he described himself as a "macho" with a destructive attitude.

== Career ==
Mana's first known band was the underground Ves.tearge in 1986. He later joined the punk rock group Girl'e, which was active from 1988 until 1990. He was known in both Ves.tearge and Girl'e by the stage name Serina, and was also a guitarist for both bands as well. Mana was then invited to become a support member of Matenrou (摩天楼; "Skyscraper"), which was active from 1990 to 1992. With Közi and future Kneuklid Romance member Kenichi already on guitar, he was asked to play bass and obliged. After leaving Matenrou in April 1992, Mana and Közi founded Malice Mizer in August. Mana was the band's lead guitarist, chief songwriter, choreographer and overall artistic director. After Malice Mizer went on an indefinite hiatus in 2001, Mana founded Moi dix Mois in 2002 as his solo project. He composes all of the music, writes the lyrics, produces, directs and designs the members' stage costumes.

Mana founded the independent record label Midi:Nette (French for "starry-eyed girl") in 1994 for the release of Malice Mizer's debut album, Memoire. In addition to most of Malice Mizer's work, and most of Moi dix Mois' work, Midi:Nette has also released music by the electronic visual kei duo Schwarz Stein. Signed to the label in 2002, Mana also produced for them. Despite their growing success, Schwarz Stein disbanded in March 2004.

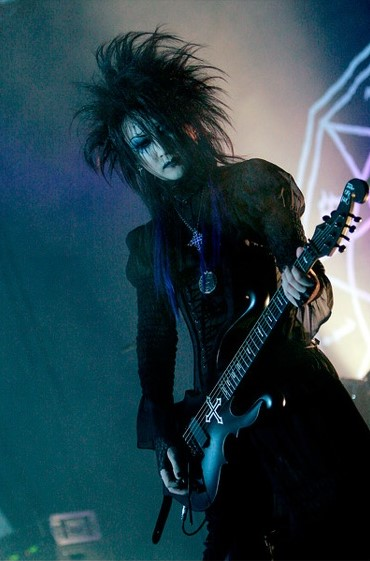
Mana playing one of his signature ESP guitars at Wave-Gotik-Treffen 2006

In 1999, Mana created his own clothing label, Moi-même-Moitié, which features two lines of designs named "Elegant Gothic Lolita" and "Elegant Gothic Aristocrat". He regularly appears in the scene's top publication, the Gothic & Lolita Bible, modeling his own designs and giving updates on his various other projects. He is recognized internationally for his fashion endeavors; in 2007, British author Philomena Keet included him as one of seven designers in her Tokyo Look Book. Several other books dealing with Japanese fashion and culture have featured him, like Style Deficit Disorder. Moi-même-Moitié clothes and apparel were also sold in boutiques in Paris and the Netherlands, as well. As of October 2019, its collection is sold exclusively online.

In 2004, Mana started to branch out internationally by opening his fan club to overseas members (a rarity amongst Japanese musicians) and setting up international distribution channels for his music and fashion. He played his first concerts with Moi dix Mois outside Japan in March 2005 in Munich, Germany and Paris, France, during which he was interviewed and featured on the cover of European music magazines, such as the German goth magazine Orkus.

At the end of 2007 Moi dix Mois returned to Europe, performing in France (a DVD of the concert was released on January 30, 2008), Germany, Finland, Sweden, Spain and Italy.

In 2012, Moi dix Mois announced their first Latin America tour titled Tetsugaku no Kakera - Chapter Six ~ Latin América Tour. The band planned to visit Brazil, Chile, Argentina and Mexico, but the tour was canceled. In 2013, Mana was featured in the music video for Kamijo's single "Louis ~Enketsu no La Vie en Rose~".

Mana has also produced solo vocalist and cellist Kanon Wakeshima, who debuted in May 2008 on Sony Defstar Records.

== Musical style and equipment ==
Mana was heavily influenced by 1980s metal, particularly Mötley Crüe, Iron Maiden and Slayer. He cited Jimmy from 44Magnum and Akira Takasaki of Loudness as his guitar heroes. However, he said he put his love of metal aside in order to create something that had never been seen before with Malice Mizer. Influenced by Bach's concertos for two harpsichords, he wanted the guitars in the band to imitate harpsichords, so he and Közi play separate melodies, do not harmonize, and never utilize bends or choking. Even after forming Moi dix Mois in order to play metal, he has continued to avoid the latter two simply out of habit.

Mana's composing style is very feeling-oriented. He refuses to learn music theory as he wants to create melodies and harmonies unlike other bands and finds regular song progressions dull. He composed based on the story he first creates, choosing the sound suitable for the story, using mainly guitar and keyboard. He believes in a natural flow of composing, and thus "his compositions often change rhythm or key, have multiple melodies and are generally unpredictable".

Mana uses ESP Guitars and, since 2002, has had several signature models with them under the Jeune Fille line. Some of them only have a bridge guitar pickup (often a EMG 81) because they feature an LED cross where the front one would be. He has only ever used humbucker pickups in his guitars. In Malice Mizer he used Roland Jazz Chorus amplifiers, but he now uses VHT.

== Public image ==
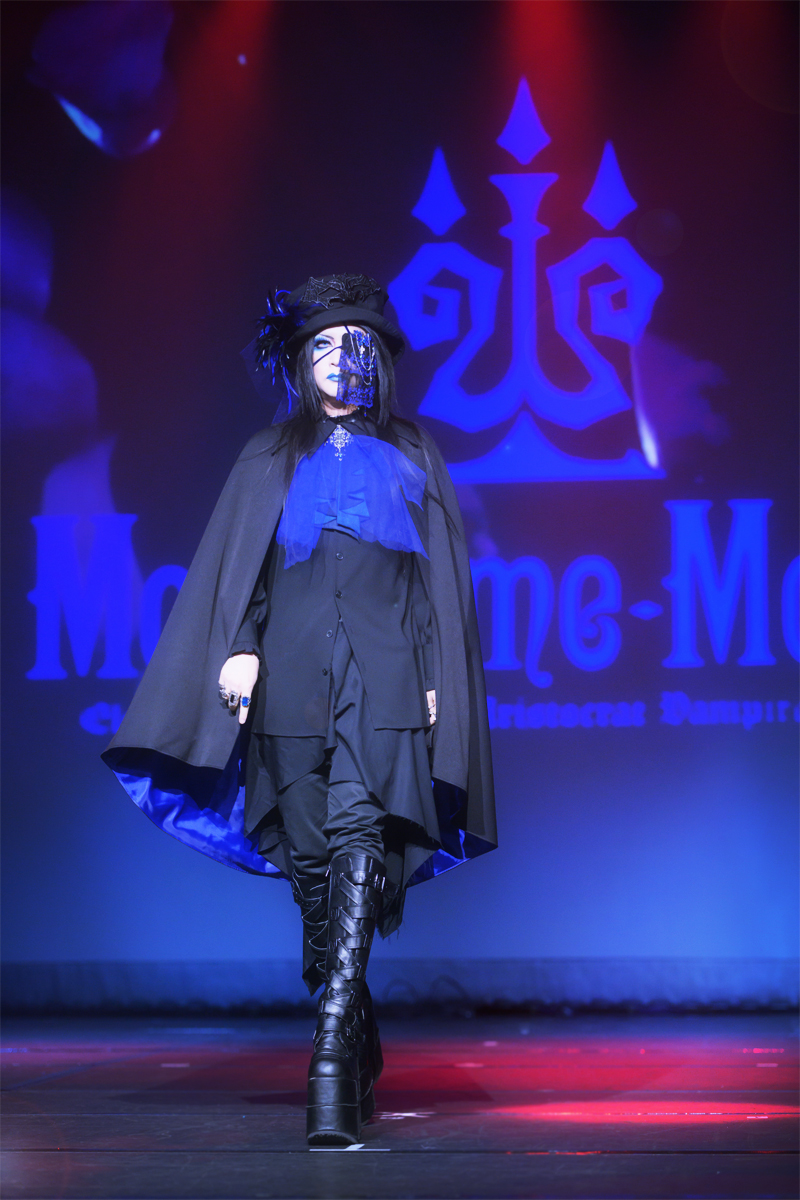
Mana at a Moi-même-Moitié fashion show, 2019

Since the days of Malice Mizer, Mana rarely speaks in public. Although it was not a conscious decision at the beginning, he did latch onto the idea when the band's direction became apparent. He speaks normally in printed interviews, but in his filmed interviews he whispers into the ear of a band member or confidante, who then relates his words back to the interviewer. He has also been known to simply look at the camera as subtitles appear, as well as using Yes/No cards and expressing himself in mime or through musical instruments.

He has, however, spoken on a few occasions. In a 1996 Malice Mizer interview on the TV show Hot Wave, he quietly replied with his name and his position in the band when introduced. But throughout the rest of the interview, Mana whispered in Gackt's ear.

Mana is known for wearing women's clothing. Mana himself has said that he wanted to be the ultimate onnagata. English-language Japanese music website JaME said he started discovering his "feminine side" before Malice Mizer. His lack of speaking, combined with his commitment to feminine dress, led to people believing he was actually female. Japanese music website Barks stated that after Mana and Malice Mizer, the number of visual kei bands with onnagata members increased.

== Band history ==
- Ves.tearge – guitar as Serina (1986–1987)
- Girl'e – guitar, synthesizer as Serina (1988–1990)
- Matenrou (摩天楼) – bass (1990–1992)
- Malice Mizer – guitar, synth guitar, keyboards, programming (1992–2001)
- Moi dix Mois – guitars, programming (2002–present)

=== Other appearances ===
- Art Marju Duchain – guitar (1994 Visual Art Collection Vol.1 ~喜劇的晚餐~ – 1996.11.08 "Visual Art Collection" ~喜劇的晚餐~, Shibuya O-West)
- Mana's Not Dead – drums (Dis Inferno Vol. V at Shibuya O-East on 2007.12.26, Visual-Kei DVD Magazine Vol. 2)
- JVM Roses Blood Symphony – guitar (2023)

== Discography ==
=== Malice Mizer ===
- Memoire (1994)
- Voyage Sans Retour (1996)
- Merveilles (1998)
- Bara no Seidou (2000)

=== Moi dix Mois ===
- Dix Infernal (2003)
- Nocturnal Opera (2004)
- Beyond the Gate (2006)
- Dixanadu (2007)
- D+Sect (2010)

=== As a producer ===
- Schwarz Stein – "Perfect Garden" (2002)
- Schwarz Stein – New Vogue Children (2003)
- Schwarz Stein – "Current" (2003)
- Schwarz Stein – Artificial Hallucination (2004)
- Kanon Wakeshima – "Still Doll" (2008)
- Kanon Wakeshima – Shinshoku Dolce (2009)
- Kanon Wakeshima – Lolitawork Libretto (2010)
- JVM Roses Blood Symphony – "Kyōsōkyoku ~Tanbinaru Kettō~" (2023)
