= Solar Ray =

Remix album by Susumu Hirasawa
- Released: October 11, 2001
- Recorded: 6 July – 11 September 2001
- Studio: Studio WIRESELF 2001 Solar Version
- Genres: Electronic rock; electronica; new-age; progressive rock; techno; technopop; world
- Length: 43:30
- Languages: Japanese, Thai
- Labels: Chaos Union, TESLAKITE CHTE-0004
- Producer: Susumu Hirasawa

Susumu Hirasawa remake chronology
Solar Ray (2001)	Switched-On Lotus (2004)

Solar Ray (stylized and subtitled as SOLAR RAY Hirasawa best recycling album Recycled by P-MODEL kernel) is a 2001 remix album by Susumu Hirasawa. It is the centerpiece of "Hirasawa Energy Works", a project to produce music in an ecologically friendly way.

== Overview ==
In 2000, Hirasawa switched from a gasoline-powered car to a hybrid electric, developing an interest in sustainable energy, specifically in the idea of using solar power to make music. He purchased two 120-watt solar panels, outfitted his home studio to be powered by them, and connected two car batteries to store additional energy, which combined allowed Hirasawa to work for 12 hours. To further optimize the work hours and prepare for bad weather days, only equipment necessary for work was ever kept on. The studio was illuminated by less than 30 small low wattage blue LEDs. Hirasawa's workdays ended when there was no more energy remaining. In total, less than 7 kg of carbon dioxide were emitted during the making of the album.

Solar Ray features remixes of songs from previous albums in the energetic technopop style of Hirasawa's former band, P-Model.

== Track listing ==
All tracks are written by Susumu Hirasawa.

No.	Title	Originally from	Length
1.	"Solar Ray 2" (ソーラ・レイ 2 Sōra Rei 2)	Water in Time and Space, 1989	3:37
2.	"AURORA 2" (オーロラ 2 Ōrora 2)	Aurora, 1994	4:27
3.	"Philosopher's Propeller 3" (賢者のプロペラ 3 Kenja no Puropera 3)	Philosopher's Propeller, 2000	4:44
4.	"Gemini 2"	Siren, 1996	4:14
5.	"Sim City 2"	Sim City, 1995	4:49
6.	"World Turbine 2" (世界タービン 2 Sekai Tābin 2)	The Ghost in Science, 1990	4:11
7.	"GARDENER KING 2" (庭師KING 2 Niwashi KING 2)	Technique of Relief, 1998	4:43
8.	"BERSERK - Forces 1.5"	The Sword-Wind Romance BERSERK Original Soundtrack, 1997	4:04
9.	"Virtual Rabbit 2" (ヴァーチュアル・ラビット 2 Vāchuaru Rabitto 2)	Virtual Rabbit, 1991	4:03
10.	"IN THE SQUARE 2" (広場で 2 Hiroba de 2)	Aurora	4:38

== Personnel ==
- Susumu Hirasawa - Vocals, Electric guitars, Synthesizers, Sampler, Amiga/Laptop, Sequencer, Programming, Production
- Sadatoshi Tainaka - Drums (sampled) on "AURORA 2"
- Miss N. & Wisakha Fraytes - Vocals (sampled) on "Sim City 2"
- Tuan Chin Kuan - Vocals (sampled) on "World Turbine"
- Masanori Chinzei - Engineering
