= Switched-On Lotus =

Remix album by Susumu Hirasawa
- Released: January 10, 2004
- Studio: Studio WIRESELF 2002 Solar Version
- Genres: new-age; technopop; world
- Length: 48:38
- Languages: Japanese, Thai
- Labels: Chaos Union, TESLAKITE CHTE-0028
- Producer: Susumu Hirasawa

Susumu Hirasawa remake chronology
Solar Ray (2001)	Switched-On Lotus (2004)	Totsu-Gen-Hen-I (2010)

Switched-On Lotus is the second remix album by Susumu Hirasawa.

== Overview ==
A memorial album dedicated to 9 Kathoeys that Hirasawa made friends with in his visits to Thailand that passed away over the years, Switched-On Lotus features more relaxed and somber arrangements of songs from Sim City and Siren, and two new songs.

The title pays homage to Switched-On Bach by Wendy Carlos.

== Track listing ==
All tracks, except Seh Le Mao, are written by Susumu Hirasawa.

No.	Title	Originally from	Length
1.	"Mermaid Song"	Siren, 1996	7:09
2.	"Switched-On Lotus"		4:31
3.	"Siam Lights"	Siren	5:42
4.	"Archetype Engine"	Sim City, 1995	4:11
5.	"Nurse Cafe"	Siren	4:15
6.	"Seh Le Mao"	Thai folk song	2:57
7.	"Kingdom"	Sim City	5:51
8.	"Lotus"	Sim City	4:52
9.	"Haldyn Hotel" (ハルディン・ホテル Harudin Hoteru)	Water in Time and Space, 1989	5:15
10.	"FGG"	The Ghost in Science, 1990	3:55

== Personnel ==
- Susumu Hirasawa - vocals, electric guitar, acoustic guitar, synthesizers

technical

- Masanori Chinzei - mixing & mastering

visuals

- Toshifumi Nakai (Seal's Floor) - design
