= Detonator Orgun =

Japanese original video animation series

- Cover of American Detonator Orgun DVD.

デトネイター・オーガン (Detoneitā Ōgan)
- Genre: Adventure, Mecha
- Original video animation
- Directed by: Masami Ōbari
- Produced by: Noburo Ishida; Satoshi Koizumi; Takanori Yaegaki
- Written by: Hideki Kakinuma
- Music by: Susumu Hirasawa
- Studio: AIC & Artmic
- Licensed by: NA: U.S. Manga Corps (expired); UK: Manga Entertainment (expired)
- Released: 25 July 1991 – 25 March 1992
- Runtime: 50–60 minutes (each)
- Episodes: 3
- Light novel
- Written by: Hideki Kakinuma
- Published by: Kadokawa Shoten
- Imprint: Kadokawa Sneaker Bunko
- Original run: August 1991 – March 1992
- Volumes: 3
- Video game
- Developer: Hot B
- Publisher: Hot B
- Genre: Adventure
- Platform: Mega-CD
- Released: 31 July 1992
- icon

Detonator Orgun (Japanese: デトネイター・オーガン, Hepburn: Detoneitā Ōgan) is a 1991 Japanese original video animation series by AIC and Artmic, directed by Masami Ōbari with character designs by Kia Asamiya.

== Plot ==
=== Part 1 "The Trinity" ===
Tomoru Shindo is a college student from City 5. He sleeps with a device that helps him explore frequencies similar to those emitted by the brain during sleep. Thereby he can record his own and other peoples thoughts and dreams through its amplifying capabilities. He picks up bits and pieces of information from an unspecified source that is slowly building into a dream of different nuances. Each night, it evolves around a woman suppressed by hostile actors in various dimensions and for every scenario, the two of them always stumble upon each other and barely slip out of harm's way. Puzzled and stricken each morning by the magnitude of the dreams, Tomoru tries to sync his hardware with the beacon. What he doesn't know is that the emitter is the fallen champion fighter Orgun, who was intercepted and subsequently assassinated on the Moon on his way to Earth. Pushed out of options and mortally wounded after his confrontation, as a last resort, he sent the signals that Tomoru has been exploring.

Another thing Tomoru doesn't know is that he isn't alone. Earth Defense Force (EDF) employee Professor Michi Kanzaki receives signals from the Moon. With the help of the super computer ISAC, she tries to compile the information in the data. She is unable to decipher the entirety of the signal, but its enough for her to understand its contents: a blueprint of an alien body! What she sees frightens her, and although she is hesitant to continue the work, she reluctantly gives way to the military's wishes.

Tomoru is steadily accessing deeper nuances of the compelling dream that comes together as Orgun, an alien madman that reveals to Tomoru parts of his life experiences. Frightened by what the feelings and memories from the fallen warrior show him, Tomoru is dragged into a psychosis. He slowly loses grip of his own reality as he is overburdened by Orgun's pain and torment. The latter is urging Tomoru as an entity in his mind that has taken hold to dive deeper, which sends Tomoru on the run. Tomoru is sinking deeper in the recesses of Orgun's memories and his urgent message to his spokesperson on Earth. A trinity develops between Tomoru, Professor Kanzaki, and the memories of Orgun held by Tomoru. However, what every party is asking themselves is why a being from such a technologically superior race has set his sights on Earth. Professor Kanzaki believes she doesn't want to know the answer to that question. Although if her employer wants to get their way, the answer to all of their questions lies within a young man who seems to have stumbled into her life's work.

=== Part 2 "Pursuit" ===
The EDF create robotic suits based on Orgun in order to defend Earth. Orgun and Tomoru meet two of the Evoluder: Leave, who dies protecting Orgun, and Lang, who battles Orgun in anger for his treason. It is revealed that the Evoluder are the descendants of a crewed space mission Earth sent to the Cygnus constellation 200 years earlier, whose crew evolved into mechanical lifeforms due to experiencing millions of years of time dilation during the journey. Some of the Evoluder are telepathically linked to certain humans, such as Tomoru with Orgun and Kumi with the Evoluder's leader, Mhiku.

=== Part 3 "Showdown" ===
Using their robotic suits, the EDF repels the Evoluder's invasion force. Kumi uses her telekinetic powers to move the Sun so Orgun can save the Earth. Zoa, the Evoluder's military commander, fires the antimatter cannon. Orgun uses his Grand Cross attack to kill Zoa and destroy the cannon. Orgun crashes onto a beach and dies while Tomoru survives. Mhiku resumes ruling the Evoluder, who peacefully leave Earth. Tomoru and Kanzaki walk off into the sunset while Orgun's remains are displayed in a museum.

== Characters ==
- Tomoru Shindo / Orgun (オーガン)
  - Voiced by: Kōichi Yamadera / Ted Lewis (US) / Roger May (UK)
- Yohko Mitsurugi
  - Voiced by: Emi Shinohara / Katherine Devaney (US) / Sara Williams (UK)
- I-Zack
  - Voiced by: Nobuo Tanaka / Justin Thompson (US)
- Professor Michi Kanzaki
  - Voiced by: Yumi Tōma / Angela Parks (US) / Joanna MacInnes (UK)
- Bannings
  - Voiced by: Bōya Ueda / Robert Chase (UK)
- Kumi Jefferson / Miku
  - Voiced by: Hiroko Kasahara / Jessica Calvello (US) / Sarah Wateridge (Kumi) Elizabeth Pearce (Mhiku) (UK)
- Commander Zoa
  - Voiced by: Kenji Utsumi / Matthew Bray (US) / William Roberts (UK)
- Virgil
  - Voiced by: Masashi Ebara
- Lang
  - Voiced by: Norio Wakamoto / Vinnie Penna (US)
- Simmons
  - Voiced by: Norio Wakamoto
- Foreston (フォレストン)
  - Voiced by: Takkō Ishimori / Jeffrey Gimble (US) / Stephen Lyons (UK)
- Nokku
  - Voiced by: Toshihiko Seki / Corey Carthew (US) / Daniel Marinker (UK)

== Media ==
=== Anime ===
The series was released on DVD in 2001 by Central Park Media in the United States, in 2002 by Happinet Pictures in Japan, and as VHS in 1997 and as DVD in 2003 by Manga Entertainment in the United Kingdom.

=== Music ===
Detonator Orgun ORIGINAL VIDEO ANIME SOUNDTRACK

Soundtrack album by Susumu Hirasawa
- Released: 25 July 1991 (1); 25 October 1991 (2); 25 March 1992 (3)
- Genres: Score; electronic; progressive rock; symphonic rock; ambient; world; technopop; new-age; collage
- Label: Polydor K.K.
- Producers: Susumu Hirasawa; Yūichi Kenjo (Executive)

Susumu Hirasawa soundtrack chronology
Detonator Orgun; ORIGINAL VIDEO ANIME SOUNDTRACK (1991)	Glory Wars (1993)

Singles from Detonator Orgun 1
- 1. "Bandeira Travellers [Physical Navigation Version]" Released: 25 June 1991 PODH-1045

Following episodes
- Detonator Orgun 2

Alternative cover
- Detonator Orgun 3

Polydor K.K., a member of the series' production committee, recommended Susumu Hirasawa, an artist from their roster, to compose music for the series. Hirasawa took the role because of a wish to work with producer Satoshi Koizumi, whose personality drew Hirasawa in after requesting him to dispel the image that anime soundtracks had. The composer was asked to write the anime's main theme first, and it was presented to Koizumi and director Masami Ōbari in late 1990, before animation had started.

Hirasawa wrote and performed all the music for the OVA, in his film score composer debut (previous soundtrack work amounted to commercial jingles and pro wrestling entrance themes). Similarly to his solo albums Water in Time and Space, The Ghost in Science and Virtual Rabbit, Hirasawa mixed together electronic and symphonic sounds, using elements across a broad range of music styles, with a large focus on classical music. At the time, Hirasawa thought of anime and movie soundtracks only as enhancements and not as standalone works, and made the soundtracks considering it as "a job" and "entertainment", employing an epic tone and dramatic exaggeration in his composing. He drew songwriting elements from his solo albums throughout the soundtrack, and used already-made songs from them as ending themes and insert songs. The first soundtrack was made simultaneously with Virtual Rabbit, and was made by Hirasawa basing himself on production materials. Detonator Orgun 3 was entirely recorded on Hirasawa's private Studio Wireself.

Hirasawa eventually got tired of working on the series, and considered Detonator Orgun 3 to be the worst album of his solo career, yet also considers the experience helpful in making later soundtracks, in particular the music for the Berserk series, and regards the "grand and delicate" technique for orchestral tones he developed through this soundtrack as guidance for his later works in general. Series writer Hideki Kakinuma enjoyed the soundtrack, later commissioning Hirasawa to compose for his fantasy manga Glory Wars; this music was later released as an image mini-album of the same name.

To promote the album, the remix of "Bandeira Travellers" (used as the ending theme of episode 1) was released a month ahead as a single and a sampler Mini CD, while the opening and ending themes of episode 1 were distributed to interested parties. In addition to the episode soundtracks, a drama CD was also released, containing select music from the soundtracks and audio from the series itself.

The series' main theme was included on the 2007 compilation Music For Movies: World of Susumu Hirasawa Soundtracks. Hirasawa had the soundtracks remastered for the 2012 boxset Haldyn Dome; his former record label did the same for the 2014 compilation Symphonic Code (since those were catalog-wide projects, songs that were also present on other albums were omitted to avoid duplication, being either included on earlier discs of the boxset or on the Archetype compilation). Glory Wars was bundled together with the soundtracks for these reissues.

Hirasawa has seldom brought up his soundtracks for the series in his overall career. Some P-Model material originated out of the soundtrack. In his 1994 shows, the title theme was played over the PA system before they began; Hirasawa usually opened his shows with "Frozen Beach '94", a rearrangement of "YOHKO Mitsurugi" with the lyrics of "Frozen Beach". A studio recording of this version, simply titled "FROZEN BEACH", was released a year later on the Scuba Recycle album.

All tracks are written by Susumu Hirasawa. "Bandeira Travellers" and "SUNSET" have string and choral arrangements by Hirasawa and Kayo "Kokubo" Matsumoto. "Root of Spirit" titled by Toshiaki Minejima with string arrangement by Jun Miyake.

Detonator Orgun 1
No.	Title	Length
1.	"DETONATOR ORGUN"	4:12
2.	"KUMI Jefferson"	3:38
3.	"E.D.F."	3:04
4.	"YOHKO Mitsurugi"	2:45
5.	"EVOLUDERS"	3:08
6.	"City-No.5"	3:06
7.	"MICHI Kanzaki"	2:12
8.	"P.A.S.F.U."	1:47
9.	"PROPAGANDA of E.D.F."	1:39
10.	"MUSEUM"	2:36
11.	"FÜHRER MEEK"	3:40
12.	"Bandeira Travellers (Physical Navigation Version)" (バンディリア旅行団 Bandiria Ryōkōdan)	5:01

Detonator Orgun 2
No.	Title	Length
1.	"SUNRISE"	1:11
2.	"Clear Mountain Top" (山頂晴れて Sanchō Harete)	4:08
3.	"DETONATOR ORGUN"	4:12
4.	"LEAVE"	2:43
5.	"NIGHTMARE"	4:44
6.	"TERROR"	1:05
7.	"YOHKO & TOMORU"	1:16
8.	"ORGUN & TOMORU"	0:59
9.	"Venus" (金星 Kinsei)	3:16
10.	"LUNGE"	4:33
11.	"SUNSET"	4:54

Detonator Orgun 3
No.	Title	Length
1.	"DETONATOR ORGUN"	4:12
2.	"PROPAGANDA of E.D.F. II"	0:32
3.	"DREAM QUEST"	3:30
4.	"DUAL MIND"	1:03
5.	"TOMORU & MICHI"	1:12
6.	"Water in Time and Space (Full Size)" (時空の水 Jikū no Mizu)	4:01
7.	"ZORMA"	0:42
8.	"SPACE FORCE"	1:11
9.	"CLIMAX"	5:05
10.	"HOPE"	0:32
11.	"Root of Spirit" (魂のふる里 Tamashii no Furusato)	5:43

== Development ==
Planning for the series started in 1989, but the animation process did not start until 1991.

== Other appearances ==
Orgun later appeared in Super Robot Wars W.

== Reception ==
Detonator Orgun has received mostly mixed reception. Ben Carlton of Manga Mania praised the series' art: "Tomoru lives in a future world which is bright, clean, and scarily antiseptic. The military look like plastic toys in their chunky armour and craft. ... skies are as rich and beautiful as any in Macross Plus". He also noted that: "Tomoru's world is also sharp and crisp as only anime can make it, with every edge and colour defined, giving more tension to the robot battles and dream sequences, where with every major change or impact the image loses definition in a sudden blur of brightness or shadow." On the other hand, Carlton criticized the UK dub's mixing, describing it as "sadly, disappointing, with uneven levels and what sounds like some nice music almost drowned out."

The Encyclopedia of Science Fiction described Detonator Orgun as a good and entertaining show, praising its eventful plot and reasonably exciting battle sequences, which do not overwhelm the narrative. However, it criticized the relatively weak characterization and occasional inconsistencies in the story, noting that viewers must make assumptions to explain certain developments, particularly the apparently unexplained extent of Kumi's psychic powers. The encyclopedia also highlighted the series' treatment of human evolution and the relationship between technological advancement and human emotions, with the Evoluders' transformation into powerful cyborgs contrasted against their loss of compassion, which they ultimately rediscover through Orgun's intervention.

Helen McCarthy in 500 Essential Anime Movies called the anime an "intriguingly fresh take on the traditions of giant robot shows", noting that three "hour-long episodes allow plenty of time to develop concepts and characters".

Paul Thomas Chapman, writing retrospectively for Otaku USA, criticized the series, stating that "it starts off dull, proceeds to take an interesting twist and mangle it beyond recognition, and concludes in a manner that can only be described as complete and utter nonsense, even by anime standards". When he talks about a scene where Kumi moves the sun with telekinetic powers, Chapman states "I don't have enough exclamations points to describe how ridiculous that is." Comparing the series to other works by its staff, he notes that "it's no surprise that the themes explored in Detonator Orgun—trans-humanism, the loneliness of space, the cyclical nature of history, and the sense of futility experienced by cultures consumed by war—are so similar to those explored in Gall Force ... But whereas Gall Force felt like a sincere work of popular science-fiction, Orgun feels like [Hideki] Kakinuma repeating himself, chewing over an idea he's already examined more thoroughly and with greater skill. As for future utopias and transformation as a metaphor for self-actualization, I've seen this kind of imagery from Masami Obari before and since", comparing the series to Angel Blade.
