= Archetype (Susumu Hirasawa album) =

Compilation album by Susumu Hirasawa
- Released: September 24, 2014
- Recorded: 1989–1995; Japan and Thailand
- Genres: Ambient; cabaret; Christmas; electronic rock; electronica; march; new-age; progressive rock; surf; symphonic rock; technopop; world
- Length: 1:49:49
- Label: Universal Music Japan
- Producer: Susumu Hirasawa

Susumu Hirasawa compilation chronology
| HALDYN DOME (2012) | Archetype (2014) | Symphonic Code (2014) |

Archetype | 1989–1995 Polydor years of Hirasawa (tentatively titled Best of Polydor years) is Susumu Hirasawa's fourth compilation album.

== Overview ==
Released as part of "Project Archetype", a Universal catalog reissue program made to commemorate the 25th anniversary of Hirasawa's debut as a solo artist, the album was part of the first wave of the project, alongside reissues of Hirasawa's first three albums. Polydor years is a spiritual successor to Polydor's ESSENCE OF HIRASAWA SOLO WORKS 1992 compilation (with the exception of the Water in Time and Space song "Skeleton Coast Park" and the original mix of "Bandiria Travellers", the entire ESSENCE OF HIRASAWA SOLO WORKS selection is present here), expanded with digitally remastered tracks released after that compilation.

Hirasawa himself had no involvement with the making of the album or the whole reissue project, but his associates were. The project was spearheaded by Osamu Takeuchi, a former Polydor employee whose first job with the company was as assistant director on Water in Time and Space (he kept his position on all subsequent Hirasawa Polydor releases, and was part of some of the impromptu chorus section that Hirasawa formed for certain songs). Kasiko Takahasi, whose Fascination company published Hirasawa's "Music Industrial Wastes" & "Near Future Never Come" books, was brought in to supervise. Masanori Chinzei, who has engineered every single Hirasawa release since 1991 supervised Universal's mastering process. Toshifumi Nakai, who designs Hirasawa's album sleeves (under the moniker "non graph") did the art direction. Takahasi, as well as Akiro "Kamio" Arishima (leader of The Bach Revolution, founder of AC Unit and holder of a 16-years long on-and-off creative partnership with Hirasawa), Yasuhiro Nakano (Disk Union manager that assisted Hirasawa in creating the SYUN label, later on funded the new wave shop Mecano) and Susumu Kunisaki (editor of Sound & Recording Magazine) all wrote of their experiences with Hirasawa's work under Polydor, which were made into new liner notes for the albums.

Polydor years consists of two thematic discs, disc 1 has songs that were important in shaping Hirasawa's pop style, disc 2 has single releases and compilation/non-instrumental soundtrack songs (including one that was made before Hirasawa signed with Polydor, but whose original label ended up being acquired by Universal). With the exception of 2 tracks, Hirasawa's soundtrack work is omitted from this compilation, as it was set to be released as its own compilation, Symphonic Code.

The album comes with a 32-page long color booklet, which contains a large essay by Sound & Recording Magazine editor Susumu Kunisaki, the cover is the photograph used on the inner part of the ESSENCE OF HIRASAWA SOLO WORKS tray card, with slivers of Hirasawa's first 5 main albums overlaid on it. The booklet is adorned with album artwork photo session outtakes of the albums covered on the compilation.

== Track listing ==
All tracks are written by Susumu Hirasawa.

Disc 1
| No. | Title | Originally from | Length |
|---|---|---|---|
| 1. | "Frozen Beach" (フローズン・ビーチ Furōzun Bīchi) | Water in Time and Space, 1989 | 4:48 |
| 2. | "Haldyn Hotel" (ハルディン・ホテル Harudin Hoteru) | Water in Time and Space, 1989 | 4:31 |
| 3. | "Venus" (金星 Kinsei) | Water in Time and Space, 1989 | 3:16 |
| 4. | "Techno Girl" (テクノの娘 Tekuno no Musume) | The Ghost in Science, 1990 | 3:46 |
| 5. | "Rocket" (ロケット Roketto) | The Ghost in Science, 1990 | 3:31 |
| 6. | "Dreaming Machine" (夢みる機械 Yume Miru Kikai) | The Ghost in Science, 1990 | 3:23 |
| 7. | "Virtual Rabbit" (ヴァーチュアル・ラビット Vāchuaru Rabitto) | Virtual Rabbit, 1991 | 3:12 |
| 8. | "Clear Mountain Top" (山頂晴れて Sanchō Harete) | Virtual Rabbit, 1991 | 4:08 |
| 9. | "Stormy Sea" (嵐の海 Arashi no Umi) | Virtual Rabbit, 1991 | 3:32 |
| 10. | "IN THE SQUARE" (広場で Hiroba de) | AURORA, 1994 | 4:33 |
| 11. | "AURORA" (オーロラ Ōrora) | AURORA, 1994 | 4:17 |
| 12. | "LOVE SONG" | AURORA, 1994 | 7:03 |
| 13. | "Archetype Engine" | Sim City, 1995 | 4:44 |
| 14. | "Kingdom" | Sim City, 1995 | 5:13 |
| 15. | "Lotus" | Sim City, 1995 | 4:25 |
| 16. | "Pacific Rim Imitation Network" (環太平洋擬装網 Kantai Heiyō Gisō Mō) | Sim City, 1995 | 3:21 |
| Total length: | | | 62:37 |

All tracks are written by Susumu Hirasawa, except "Bandiria Travellers", with string & choral arrangement by Hirasawa & Kayo "Kokubo" Matsumoto, "Haldyn Hotel [Fractal Terrain Track]", remixed by Masanori Chinzei, "Root of Spirit", with titling by Toshiaki Minejima and string arrangement by Jun Miyake, "Fish Song", with music by Hirasawa & Akiro "Kamio" Arishima and string arrangement by Hirasawa & Matsumoto, "Turista", by Ângelo Apolônio, and "Christmas in Africa", with lyrics by Hirasawa & Masami Orimo.

Disc 2
| No. | Title | Originally from | Length |
|---|---|---|---|
| 17. | "World Turbine" (世界タービン Sekai Tābin) | single, 1990 | 4:02 |
| 18. | "Solar Ray [SPECTRUM 2 TYPE]" (ソーラ・レイ Sōra Rei) | "World Turbine" single, 1990 | 3:09 |
| 19. | "Bandiria Travellers [Physical Navigation Version]" (バンディリア旅行団 Bandiria Ryōkōdan) | single, 1991 | 5:01 |
| 20. | "Haldyn Hotel [Fractal Terrain Track]" (ハルディン・ホテル Harudin Hoteru) | "Bandiria Travellers [Physical Navigation Version]" single, 1991 | 4:37 |
| 21. | "Root of Spirit" (魂のふる里 Tamashii no Furusato) | single, 1992 | 5:43 |
| 22. | "Fish Song" (フィッシュ・ソング Fisshu Songu) | "Root of Spirit" single, 1992 | 6:05 |
| 23. | "Kamui Mintara" (カムイ・ミンタラ) | Kamui Mintara, 1992 | 4:56 |
| 24. | "TURISTA" (The Atlantics cover) (instrumental) | les enfants, 1989 | 3:00 |
| 25. | "AFTER THE WARS" | Glory Wars, 1993 | 5:59 |
| 26. | "Water in Time and Space [Full Size]" (時空の水 Jikū no Mizu) (instrumental) | Detonator Orgun 3, 1992 | 4:01 |
| 27. | "Christmas in Africa" (アフリカのクリスマス Afurika no Kurisumasu) (with Wakako Shimazaki) | White Album'90, 1990 | 3:48 |
| Total length: | | | 47:12 |

== Personnel ==
- Susumu Hirasawa – Vocals, Acoustic guitars, Bass guitars, Classical guitars, Electric guitars, Timpani, Percussion, Crumhorn, Autoharp, Toy Accordion, Synthesizers, Drum machines, Samplers, Amigas, Vista, Sequencers, Computer programming/Programming

Additional musicians

- Shingo Tomoda – Drums on "Frozen Beach", "Venus" and "Fish Song, Percussion on "Fish Song"
- Minoru Yoshizawa – Crumhorn on "Haldyn Hotel"
- Kayo "Kokubo" Matsumoto – Voice on "Techno Girl", Acoustic Piano on "Water in Time and Space (Full Size)"
- Midori Ayabe, Hiroki Yamamoto, Nagisa Kiriyama and Yoshiaki Funayama – Violin on "Techno Girl" and "Fish Song"
- Kaori Kurimaru and Rika Morozumi – Viola on "Techno Girl" and "Fish Song"
- Hirohisa Miyata and Makoto Ohsawa – Cello on "Techno Girl" and "Fish Song"
- Jun Togawa – Vocals on "Clear Mountain Top"
- Kathoey (uncredited) – Voice on "Archetype Engine", "Kingdom" and "Pacific Rim Imitation Network"
- Tuan Chin Kuan – Voice (Sampled) on "World Turbine"
- Kaoru Kinjo – Vocals on "World Turbine"
- Teru Uchida Strings – Strings on "Bandiria Travellers"
- Asuka Kaneko's Section – Strings (Violin, Cello, Viola, Contrabass) on "Root of Spirit"
- Kazuhide "Kitune" Akimoto – Bass on "Fish Song"
- Ainu (uncredited) – Voice on "Kamui Mintara"
- Wakako Shimazaki – Vocals on "Christmas in Africa"

Backing vocalists

- Akiro "Kamio" Arishima, Michäel Saturnus and Hisayuki Makanae – "Haldyn Hotel"/"Fractal Terrain Track"
- Kazuhide "Kitune" Akimoto and Masahiro Furukawa – "Haldyn Hotel"/"Fractal Terrain Track" and "Rocket"
- Jun Togawa, Yūichi Hirasawa, Katsuhiko Akiyama, Yūji Oda, Shigeru Fujishima – "Rocket"
- Yūichi Kenjo and Osamu Takeuchi – "Rocket", "Virtual Rabbit" and "Clear Mountain Top"
- Masanori Chinzei and Chūju Yamaguchi – "Virtual Rabbit" and "Clear Mountain Top"
- THE GROOVERS (Yasuchika Fujii, Kazuhiko Fujii and Toshihiko "BOB" Takahashi) – "Clear Mountain Top"
- Tokyo Philharmonic Chorus – "Bandiria Travellers"

Technical staff

- Susumu Hirasawa, Yasushi Ide, Akiro "Kamio" Arishima, Yūichi Kenjo – Production
- Yoshiaki Kondo, Masanori Chinzei – Engineering
- Kiyoshi Inagaki – Art director

Reissue staff

- Osamu Takeuchi – Music Supervision
- Kasiko Takahasi – Supervision
- Masanori Chinzei – Remastering Supervision
- Kenji Yoshino – Remastering
- Akiro "Kamio" Arishima, Yasuhiro Nakano, Kasiko Takahasi, Susumu Kunisaki – Liner notes
- Toshifumi Nakai – Art direction
