= Technique of Relief =

Studio album by Susumu Hirasawa
- Released: August 21, 1998
- Studio: Internal Studio, Bangkok; Studio Parkside, Minami, Toda, Saitama
- Genre: Art pop; electronic; progressive pop; world music
- Length: 53:44
- Label: Nippon Columbia, TESLAKITE
- Producer: Eiichi Yamakawa (exec.), Susumu Hirasawa

Susumu Hirasawa chronology
Siren (1996)	Technique of Relief (1998)	Philosopher's Propeller (2000)

Singles from Technique of Relief (Note: 7-inch vinyl release.)
- 1. "'Town-0 Phase-5' / 'Gardener King'" Released: November 3, 2019

Technique of Relief (救済の技法, Kyūsai no Gihō) is the seventh solo album by Susumu Hirasawa, released on August 21, 1998 via Nippon Columbia. It is considered to be Hirasawa's most popular album. Like most of his material, the majority of the instrumentation is by Hirasawa.

== Overview ==
With his previous solo album Siren, Susumu Hirasawa felt that he perfected both the "simulated world music" concept that started on Sim City and his post-Aurora vocal style. He essentially stopped experimenting with his style in the late 1990s because he felt that no new developments on that front would arise. Instead, he shifted his focus towards creating music for Interactive Live Shows.

Technique of Relief was, from the beginning, a concept album for an interactive live. It builds upon a broad "restoration of a perfect character" theme introduced in Scuba: while that album was about bringing scattered individuals back together into a group, Technique of Relief has the thoughts and experiences of many people combining into a neural network and becoming a single entity. The concept of "Green Nerve", which Hirasawa had played with in previous works, appears here as the character of a perfected human. The plot begins as the World Cell's breakdown causes the Green Nerve Network to cease functioning, and the Bridge Builder (Hirasawa) has to repair it.

Hirasawa rerecorded songs originally performed by Berserk actress Yūko Miyamura ("Moon Time" and "Mother") for the album. All the album's tracks weren't conceptualized and recorded holistically, but rather continually modified based on various phrases and flourishes he thought of on the fly.

On Technique of Relief, Hirasawa incorporated new sounds that he came in contact with into its style: tracks from a cassette tape of Indian music that a friend of his bought in the country were extensively sampled, 8 bit 22.050 kHz techno/jungle MOD files downloaded from a German site were used as drum parts for four songs ("Town-0 Phase-5", "The Man from Narcissus Space", "Strange Night of the Omnificience", "World Cell") and he applied elements from luk thung after seeing its popularity across all layers of Thai society.

Technique of Relief is the last of Hirasawa's main discography to be recorded in Bangkok. Unlike previous occasions, he recorded electric guitar parts as well as vocal ones. Since he did not bring one of his trademark Talbo guitars to Thailand, he had to rent a Fender Stratocaster, whose sound he disliked. The album is also the first since Virtual Rabbit where Japanese guest musicians, both singers and instrumentalists, appear.

== Track listing ==
All tracks are written by Susumu Hirasawa.

No.	Title	Length
1.	"Town-0 Phase-5"	4:35
2.	"Moon Time"	6:19
3.	"Gardener King" (庭師KING Niwashi KING)	4:40
4.	"Ghost Bridge"	5:43
5.	"The Man from Narcissus Space" (ナーシサス次元から来た人 Nāshisasu Jigen Kara Kita Hito)	6:24
6.	"Strange Night of the Omnificence" (万象の奇夜 Banshō no Kiya)	6:56
7.	"Mother"	4:37
8.	"Bridge Builder" (橋大工 Hashi Daiku)	5:28
9.	"Technique of Relief" (救済の技法 Kyūsai no Gihō)	4:33
10.	"World Cell" (instrumental)	4:30

2009 HQCD reissue bonus tracks ("BERSERK -Forces-" single)
No.	Title	Length
11.	"BERSERK -Forces-"	4:03
12.	"BERSERK -Forces-" (GOD HAND MIX)	4:08
13.	"BERSERK -Forces-" (original KARAOKE) (オリジナル・カラオケ orijinaru KARAOKE)	4:04
14.	"BERSERK -Forces-" (TV version)	1:53

== Personnel ==
- Susumu Hirasawa - Vocals, Electric guitar (Fender Stratocaster), Acoustic guitar (Fernandes), Synthesizers (E-mu Proteus/2, Korg M1R, Roland JD-800, Roland JD-990), Sampler (Akai S1100), Drum machine (Roland R-8 with DANCE card), Amiga (4000/040), Sequencer (Bars&Pipes Professional), Programming, Production

additional performers

- Mari Furusato - Soprano Voice on "Moon Time"
- Keiju Nakajima - Sumatra Magic Horn on "Mother"
- uncredited sao praphet song friend of Hirasawa's whom he nicknamed "Fake Breast Brother" (擬似的な胸の弟) - Soprano Solo on "The Man from Narcissus Space"

technical

- Masanori Chinzei - Recording and Mixing
- Nitt, Toshiyuki Nakamura - Assistant Engineering
- Yuka Koizumi (Orange) - Mastering

visuals

- Kiyoshi Inagaki (Tristero Design) - Art Direction & Design
- Yosuke Komatsu (Odd Job Ltd.) - Photography
- Kazunori Yoshida - Hair & Make-Up
- Akemi Tsujitani - Styling

operations

- Nippon Columbia
  - Teslakite
    - Eiichi Yamakawa - Production (Executive)
    - Toshiyuki Akimoto - Direction
    - Mika Hirano - Promotion
  - Shingo Ninomiya - Promotion
  - Naoya Shimizu - Sales Promotion
  - Chika Fujita - Edit
- Chaos Union Soho Project - Artist Management
- Wai Rachatachotic - Coordinator
- Chaos Thai: Takahisa Taira, Sajja "Yai" Tanyacharoen

thanks

- Danuphol "P. Jae" Kaewkan, Kentaro Miura, Akira Shimada (Young Animal), Toshio Nakatani (NTV), Satoshi Kon, Suguru Funatsu (Nippon Columbia), Tokinori Katakura & Yuka Furusato (Nippon Columbia), Yasumi Tanaka, NIFTY-Serve FAMIGA Interactive Live 要素技術支援 Project

== Release history ==
Date	Label(s)	Format	Catalog	Notes
August 21, 1998	Nippon Columbia, Teslakite	CD	COCP-30019	
March 18, 2009	Columbia Music Entertainment	HQCD	COCP-35525	Digitally remastered, with a soundtrack single for bonus tracks.
March 18, 2009	Columbia Music Entertainment	Digital Download	none	Digitally remastered, with a soundtrack single for bonus tracks.
February 29, 2012	Chaos Union, Teslakite	CD	CHTE-0060	Remastered by Masanori Chinzei. Disc 7 of the HALDYN DOME box set.
November 27, 2021	Nippon Columbia, Teslakite	2LP	COJA-9437-8	Side D contains bonus tracks consistent with the 2009 HQCD reissue. (Note: Cf., e.g., the website Nippon Columbia, "Technique of Relief" and "Technique of Relief - Analog" pages.) Red-colored vinyl. Record Day 2021 release.

== Bibliography ==
- Interview 平沢進 [Interview Susumu Hirasawa]. Keyboard Magazine (in Japanese). Vol. 20, no. 10 #246. Rittor Music. October 1998. ISSN 1344-6371.
- Nirezaki, Akio (October 1998). 平沢進 INTERVIEW [Susumu Hirasawa Interview]. KB Special (in Japanese). Vol. 15, no. 10 #165. Rittor Music. pp. 23–24.
- Takahasi, Kasiko (2010) [1999], 改訂DIGITAL復刻版 音楽産業廃棄物 [Music Industrial Wastes Rev.2.4], vol. Hirasawa Side — 卓上のウロボロス [Desktop Ouroboros] (3rd ed.), Fascination.
