= Philosopher's Propeller =

Studio album by Susumu Hirasawa
- Released: October 5, 2000
- Studio: Studio Wireself (rec/mix); Sunrise Studio Akasaka DMR (mast.)
- Genre: Electronica; new-age; orchestral; world
- Length: 44:52
- Label: Chaos Union, TESLAKITE
- Producer: Kenji Sato (exec.); Susumu Hirasawa

Susumu Hirasawa chronology
Technique of Relief (1998)	Philosopher's Propeller (2000)	Blue Limbo (2003)

Philosopher's Propeller (賢者のプロペラ, Kenja no Puropera) is the eighth solo album by Susumu Hirasawa, the first to be completely self-released.

The album was inspired by Myanmar alchemy, and several song names come from Latin terms pertaining to the alchemical magnum opus.

== Track listing ==
All tracks are written by Susumu Hirasawa.

CD version
No.	Title	Length
1.	"Philosopher's Propeller-1" (賢者のプロペラ-1 Kenja no Puropera-1)	4:28
2.	"Rubedo (Reddening)" (ルベド(赤化) Rubedo (Sekka))	4:38
3.	"Nigredo (Blackening)" (ニグレド(黒化) Niguredo (Kokka))	4:51
4.	"Albedo (Whitening)" (アルベド(白化) Arubedo (Hokka)) (instrumental)	3:18
5.	"Quadratur des Zirkels" (円積法 En Sekihō)	4:03
6.	"The Garden Where the Solutions are Found" (課題が見出される庭園 Kadai ga Miidasa Reru Teien) (instrumental)	5:42
7.	"An Expert Mountain" (達人の山 Tatsujin no Yama)	4:32
8.	"Opus (The Fool's Rose Garden)" (作業(愚者の薔薇園) Sagyō (Gusha no Baraen))	4:15
9.	"Rotation (LOTUS-2)" (ロタティオン(LOTUS-2))	3:58
10.	"Philosopher's Propeller-2" (賢者のプロペラ-2 Kenja no Puropera-2)	5:05

MP3 version - part 1
No.	Title	Length
1.	"Philosopher's Propeller-1" (賢者のプロペラ Kenja no Puropera)
2.	"Rubedo (Reddening)" (ルベド(赤化) Rubedo (Sekka))
3.	"The Garden Where the Solutions are Found" (課題が見出される庭園 Kadai ga Miidasa Reru Teien) (instrumental)
4.	"An Expert Mountain" (達人の山 Tatsujin no Yama)
5.	"Rotation (LOTUS-2)" (ロタティオン(LOTUS-2))

MP3 version - part 2
No.	Title	Length
6.	"Nigredo (Blackening)" (ニグレド(黒化) Niguredo (Kokka))
7.	"Albedo (Whitening)" (アルベド(白化) Arubedo (Hokka)) (instrumental)
8.	"Quadratur des Zirkels" (円積法 En Sekihō)
9.	"Opus (The Fool's Rose Garden)" (作業(愚者の薔薇園) Sagyō (Gusha no Baraen))
10.	"Philosopher's Propeller-2" (賢者のプロペラ-2 Kenja no Puropera-2)

== Personnel ==
- Susumu Hirasawa - vocals, all instruments, production

technical

- Masanori Chinzei - recording, mixing, project management
- Keiko Ueda (Pharos) - mastering

visuals

- Toshifumi Nakai (Seal/S Floor) - design
- Hideki Namai - photography
- Kazunori Yoshida - hair & make-up

operations

- Teslakite - promotion
  - Mika Hirano, Rihito Yumoto
- Kenji "Sato-ken" Sato (Chaos Union) - executive production

Special Thanks

- Hirokazu Tsuchiya (Nikkei netn@avi)
- Kasiko Takahasi (Fascination)
- Masaru Owaku (A-Shield)
- @Nifty Amiga Forum
- Atsushi Kakuta
- U Khin Maung Aye
- Khin May Phue
- MJRC
  - Hirosi Watanabe, Shio Nishikawa, Thaung Htun

== Release history ==
Date	Label(s)	Format	Catalog	Notes
October 5, 2000	Chaos Union, TESLAKITE	CD	CHTE-0001	
November 1, 2000	Chaos Union, TESLAKITE	MP3	WC-00001	Tracks differ from their CD version counterparts to varying extents. All songs have since been re-ordered to follow the CD sequence and are available for download individually (cat. nos. WC-00010 – 19).
December 22, 2000; January 26, 2001	Chaos Union, TESLAKITE	MP3	WC-00001	Tracks differ from their CD version counterparts to varying extents. All songs have since been re-ordered to follow the CD sequence and are available for download individually (cat. nos. WC-00010 – 19).

- "Rotation (LOTUS-2)" (CD version) is included on the Millennium Actress soundtrack and Music For Movies～World of Susumu Hirasawa Soundtracks compilation.
