= Jun Togawa =

Japanese singer, musician and actress (born 1961)

Jun Togawa 戸川 純
- Born: Junko Togawa (戸川 順子); 31 March 1961 (age 65); Shinjuku, Tokyo
- Genres: Avant-garde; new wave; J-pop
- Occupations: Singer; musician; actress
- Instruments: Vocals; drums
- Years active: 1979-present

Jun Togawa (戸川純, Togawa Jun; born 31 March 1961) is a Japanese singer, musician and actress. She is one of the greatest influences on Japanese avant-garde music and media, and her career spans over approximately 45 years. Her close friends over the years include Susumu Hirasawa. She was mainly active from 1981 to 1995.

== Career ==
After gaining attention as a guest singer for the New Wave band Halmens and her acting roles in Japanese dramas and commercials for the Washlet, she began her professional music career in the early 1980s as a singer. She joined former Halmens member Kōji Ueno and artist/lyricist Keiichi Ohta to form the Shōwa era-themed band Guernica in 1981, whose first album was released under YEN Records in 1982.

In 1984, during a hiatus on Guernica, she released a live album Ura Tamahime with a backing band called Yapoos; the band included some former Halmens members and the album featured several covers of Halmens songs. The same year, she released her debut solo album Tamahime-sama (also on YEN), containing themes of menstruation, womanhood, and romance with a recurring insect and pupa motif. The following year, she came out with album Kyokuto Ian Shoka (Far Eastern Comfort Songs) with a backing band called the Jun Togawa Unit. Later that year she released her album Suki Suki Daisuki, a satirical take on aidoru music, this time under her own Alfa Records sublabel, HYS.

She joined Yapoos and solidified the group as an official band, releasing their first album in 1987. She did two more albums with Guernica in 1988 and 1989, and continued singing with Yapoos, releasing albums mainly into the mid 90s, then one in 2003 and another in 2019. Generally the differentiation between her self-named bands and the Yapoos has been a greater degree of collaboration in the latter.

Although she never achieved major pop success, she survived as an influential and respected underground music figure both solo and as the lead singer of Guernica and her most commercial project Yapoos where she is particularly noted for her connection to eroguro culture.

Notable collaborators over the years include Haruomi Hosono who sponsored Guernica's first album and produced & wrote music for some of her earlier works. Her late sister Kyoko Togawa was an actress who at times ventured into the music world and cross collaborated at times. Around 1990 Jun shared management with Susumu Hirasawa resulting in quite a number of collaborations.

She has acted in the films Untamagiru and The Family Game.

In 1989, Susumu Hirasawa, who had placed his band P-MODEL on hiatus, joined the Yapoos as support, appearing in the "Bach Studio II" section of the TV program "Yume de Aietara", where he played in a session with Downtown, Ucchan Nanchan and Susumu Hirasawa.

In 1991, Togawa appeared on the TV Tokyo program Jun Togawa x Susumu Hirasawa (MC: Kenzo Saeki) "Jun Togawa Revival Festival!"

In 1992, Susumu Hirasawa offered her "Beals (1992)" as a Yapoos song.

In 1995, "Showa Kyounen" was released to commemorate the 10th anniversary of Jun Togawa's performing career. Based on the concept of "covering nostalgic melodies of the Showa era," the album contained six songs arranged by Susumu Hirasawa. The songs include "Ribbon Knight" composed by Isao Tomita and arranged by Susumu Hirasawa.

Her 2004 album, Togawa Fiction, with the Jun Togawa Band, featured elements of progressive rock, electropop and other genres. In 2008, she released a career-spanning three-CD boxed set, Togawa Legend Self Select Best & Rare 1979-2008 which featured many of her most popular songs along with several scarcer tracks and hard to find collaborations.

She marked the 35th anniversary of her professional career in 2016 by releasing new collaboration albums with Vampillia and Hijokaidan, her first new recordings in twelve years.

== Relationship with Susumu Hirasawa ==
Jun Togawa and Susumu Hirasawa became close friends as they shared stories about each other's past and how they perceived gender and people. They participated in each other's tours, and in the 1990s, they worked together on music and gender-related conversations in magazines and on TV. Hirasawa says, "It's a difficult task to determine my favorite Jun Togawa song," referring to one of her masterpieces, "Teinen Pushiganga," as "that is the god who made God." Togawa has also covered Hirasawa's solo song "Venus" at her own live performances.

== Discography ==
=== Solo albums ===
- [1984.01.24] Tamahime-sama
- [1985.11.10] Suki Suki Daisuki

=== Collaboration albums ===
- [1985.03.25] Kyokuto Ian Shoka (as Jun Togawa Unit)
- [2016.01.20] "Togawa Kaidan (戸川階段)" (with Hijokaidan)
- [2016.12.14] Watashi Ga Nakou Hototogisu (with Vampillia)
- [2018.11.21] Jun Togawa avec Kei Ookubo (with Kei Ookubo)

=== Albums with Yapoos ===
- [1984.04.25] Ura-Tamahime (live)
- [1987.12.16] Yapoos Keikaku
- [1988.09.21] Daitenshi No Youni
- [1991.06.07] Dial Y O Mawase
- [1992.10.28] Dadada ism
- [1995.01.31] Yapoos No Fushin Na Koudou (live 1993)
- [1995.06.21] HYS
- [2019.12.11] ヤプーズの不審な行動 令和元年 - Suspicious Behavior Of Yapoos The 1st Year Of Reiwa Era (Yapoos)

=== Albums with Guernica ===
- [1982.xx.xx] Kaizou E No Yakudou (with Guernica)
- [1988.xx.xx] Shinseiki E No Unga (with Guernica)
- [1989.03.05] Denri-sou Kara no Manazashi (with Guernica)

=== Solo mini albums ===
- [1989.12.16] Showa Kyonen
- [2000.09.25] 20th Jun Togawa
- [2004.09.02] Togawa Fiction (as Jun Togawa Band)

=== Singles, EPs ===
- [1982.12.05] Ginrin wa Utau / Maronie Dokuhon Guernica
- [1984.05.25] Radar Man / Boshi Jusei (Jun Togawa)
- [1985.04.10] Poesy / Poesy instrumental (Jun Togawa)
- [1985.10.25] Osozaki Girl (Jun Togawa)
- [1986.02.10] Sayonara wo Oshiete (Jun Togawa)
- [1987.12.16] Barbara Sexaroid / Cecil Cut (Yapoos)
- [1990.10.21] Virgin Blues (Jun Togawa)
- [1991.07.21] Infinite Productions Remix (Jun Togawa in the '90s)
- [1991.05.02] Men's Junan (Yapoos)
- [1995.03.01] Honou no Shoujo (Yapoos)
- [2003.04.10] CD-Y (mini-album) (Yapoos)

=== Compilations ===
- [1987.xx.xx] Tokyo No Yaban (Tokyo Barbarism) (Jun Togawa) Remixed compilation
- [1991.05.21] Yapoos Best (Yapoos)
- [1996.09.26] Twins Super Best of Togawa Jun (2-CD set)
- [2001.12.19] Twin Very Best Collection (2-CD set) (Jun Togawa)
- [2002.12.04] In Memoria Futuri (three CD boxed set comprising Guernica's three original albums plus demos, live tracks, outtakes and live video footage of Guernica performing "Dokuro no enbukyoku" at Club Quattro, Shibuya, Tokyo on 27 July 1988) (Guernica)
- [2008.07.09] Togawa Legend Self Select Best & Rare 1979-2008 (3 CD boxed set) (Jun Togawa)
- [2009.07.22] Teichiku Works. Jun Togawa 30th Anniversary (6 CDs and 3 DVDs). The first 5 CDs are reissued albums with bonus tracks, the sixth CD features previously unreleased live and demo recordings of Guernica.
- [2012.07.25] Mushi no Onna - Mika Ninagawa Selection

=== Notable guest appearances ===
- [1984.08.25] Chojiku Korodasutan Ryokoki (Apogee & Perigee) Jun Togawa provides vocals for 4 tracks.
- [1985.00.00] Shijin no Ie (House Of The Poet) (Joe Jackson & The Tokyo Symphony Orchestra) Jun Togawa provides all vocals.
- [1989.09.01] Water in Time and Space (Susumu Hirasawa) Jun Togawa provides vocals for the track No Workshop (仕事場はタブー, Shigotoba wa Taboo).
- [1990.05.25] The Ghost in Science (Susumu Hirasawa) Jun Togawa provides vocals for the tracks Rocket (ロケット, Roketto) & Cowboy and Indian (カウボーイとインディアン, Kaubōi to Indian).
- [1990.10.25] error CD (Susumu Hirasawa) Jun Togawa provides vocals for the track Rocket (ロケット, Roketto).
- [1991.05.25] Virtual Rabbit (Susumu Hirasawa) Jun Togawa provides vocals for the track Clear Mountain Top (山頂晴れて, Sanchō Harete).
- [1992.06.xx] Histoire du Soldat (Neko Saito, Koichi Makigami, Jun Togawa, Demon Kogure) Jun Togawa plays the part of the Princess and also narrates this version of Igor Stravinsky's piece, conducted by Neko Saito.
- [2001.08.30] All Dogs Go To Heaven (CD Soundtrack to Keralino Sandorovich's stage play) Jun Togawa sings on three tracks: Rawhide (ローハイド, Rōhaido), Open The Night and Falling In Love Again (また恋しちゃったのよ, Mata koi shichatta no yo)
- [2002.03.26] Dreams (Otomo Yoshihide's New Jazz Ensemble) Jun Togawa provides vocals for 3 tracks.
- [2005.01.15] Good Girls Get Fed, Bad Girls Get Eaten (Tricomi featuring Jun Togawa) Jun Togawa provides vocals for six of the eight tracks.
- [2012.02.29] HALDYN DOME (Susumu Hirasawa) Box Set that contains all previous appearances.
- [2017.10.25] "Like the 20th Century" (Kei Ohkubo) Jun Togawa provides guest vocals for Vocalise No.1 and 20 Seiki Mitai Ni
