= Water in Time and Space =

Studio album by Susumu Hirasawa
- Released: September 1, 1989
- Recorded: April – May 1989
- Studio: Various: Keystone Studio (Recording & Mixing), Ōhashi, Meguro, Tokyo; Keystone Izu Studio, Yawatano, Itō, Shizuoka; Sound Inn, Yonban, Chiyoda, Tokyo; Gold Rush Studio (Mixing), Kojima, Taitō, Tokyo
- Genre: Art pop; new-age; progressive rock; techno-pop; world
- Length: 43:16
- Label: Polydor K.K.
- Producer: Susumu Hirasawa

Susumu Hirasawa chronology
Water in Time and Space (1989)	The Ghost in Science (1990)

Water in Time and Space (時空の水, Jikū no Mizu) is the debut studio album by Japanese musician Susumu Hirasawa, released on September 1, 1989 via Polydor K.K. It is his first album and first musical material since the hiatus of the band P-Model.

== Background ==
In December 1988, Hirasawa decided to put his post-punk/new wave band P-Model on hiatus after spending two years being unable to arrange a recording deal, feeling that the group's continued existence was taking a mental and emotional toll on him. The following year, he was signed to Polydor, where he recorded Water in Time and Space.

== Composition ==
Water in Time and Space is half a self-cover album: With the band being put on hold, P-Model's Monster album was not recorded. However, Hirasawa could not afford to discard three of its songs and salvaged them for the album instead. Two songs from lo-fi cassette only releases (Scuba and Charity Original Tape) were also rearranged for the album, with Hirasawa wanting a better form for the former and the latter being a guideline for the style of Water in Time and Space. To prepare for the songwriting of new material, Hirasawa re-recorded "Happening by the Windowsill" by his former progressive rock band Mandrake as an étude.

Water in Time and Space features a large variety of styles, such as march, orchestral, western and folk, influenced by Jungian, New Age and Andean themes. The album has no particular total concept, unlike most of Hirasawa's solo output. Free from the constraints of P-Model and the band's nervous energy, the album is comparatively light and brisk. Though created with heavy use of digital devices, it is one of Hirasawa's least electronic works, with prominent use of acoustic tones throughout. In the manner of P-Model's 1986 album One Pattern, Hirasawa also put emphasis on sampling, with such sounds as bird chirping and coin rolling being used as rhythmic backing.

== Production ==
Water in Time and Space is built around the Korg M1 workstation synthesizer, whose expansive, organic-sounding palette completely replaces the digital tones from the Casio synths used by the P-Model in their later years. The M1's built-in sequencer and its large memory bank led to a shift in Hirasawa's production style; with the M1, he could record parts of songs that were not completed in studio at home, being more equipped to make music by himself and less dependent on labels. Still, some equipment from One Pattern and Monster was carried over, as well as the mechanical lo-fi sound of the former album, setting up the general production style of Hirasawa's first solo phase.

The chief engineer of the album is Yoshiaki Kondo, who worked on Karkador and One Pattern, this being the first project where Hirasawa got his long-sought services unaltered. Besides electronics, Hirasawa also performed with plucked string instruments and percussion instruments. Only two tracks were performed by Hirasawa completely solo, while others feature a variety of guest performers, such as session musicians for parts he could not play by himself and friends from the underground new wave scene. For songs that required choral backing, Hirasawa would get whoever was present during recording and form an impromptu choir.

== Track listing ==
All tracks are written by Susumu Hirasawa, except "Root of Spirit", with titling by Toshiaki Minejima and string arrangement by Jun Miyake.

No.	Title	Length
1.	"Haldyn Hotel" (ハルディン・ホテル Harudin Hoteru)	4:32
2.	"Root of Spirit" (魂のふる里 Tamashii no Furusato)	5:42
3.	"Coyote" (コヨーテ Koyōte)	4:48
4.	"Solar Ray" (ソーラ・レイ Sōra Rei)	3:08
5.	"No Workshop" (仕事場はタブー Shigotoba wa Taboo)	4:02
6.	"Dune" (デューン Dyūn)	4:36
7.	"Frozen Beach" (フローズン・ビーチ Furōzun Bīchi)	4:53
8.	"Water in Time and Space" (時空の水 Jikū no Mizu) (instrumental)	2:17
9.	"Skeleton Coast Park" (スケルトン・コースト公園 Sukeruton Kōsuto Kōen)	5:52
10.	"Venus" (金星 Kinsei)	3:17

== Personnel ==
- Susumu Hirasawa – vocals, classical guitar, electric guitar, bass, crumhorn (on "Haldyn Hotel"), timpani, percussion, synthesizers, drum machine, sampler, sequencer, Ozonotech Computer ("Say" program – Computer Voice on "Dune"), programming, arrangements, production

additional musicians

- Minoru Yoshizawa – crumhorn (credited as "Krumme Horn") on "Haldyn Hotel"
- Akiro "Kamio" Arishima, Masahiro Furukawa & Hisayuki Makanae – backing vocals on "Haldyn Hotel"
- Kazuhide "Kitune" Akimoto (also listed under special thanks as "Akimoto-kun") – backing vocals on "Haldyn Hotel" and "Coyote"
- Asuka Kaneko's Section – violins, cellos, violas and double basses on "Root of Spirit"
- Shingo Tomoda – percussion on "Coyote", drums on "Frozen Beach" and "Venus"
- Kazumi "Keralino 'Kera' Sandorovich" Kobayashi – backing vocals and Coyote Voice on "Coyote"
- Jun Togawa (courtesy of Teichiku Records) – backing vocals on "No Workshop"
- Kayo "Kokubo" Matsumoto – acoustic piano on "Water in Time and Space"
- Tsuneo Imahori – bass on "Skeleton Coast Park"
- Hiroshi Harada – min'yō styled vocal on "Skeleton Coast Park"

technical

- Yoshiaki Kondo (Gok Sound) – recording & mixing engineer
- Shinichi Tomita, Nobuhiko Matsufuji, Atsushi Hattori (Mix); Masanori Ihara (Gold Rush Studio); Yoshikatsu Takatori (Sound Inn) – second engineers

visuals

- Kiyoshi Inagaki – art director
- Mado & Vincent – photography
- Akemi Tsujitani, Michiko Aoki – styling
- Kazunori Yoshida – hair & makeup

operations

- Octave
  - Mitsuo Nagano – artist management
  - Megumi Watase – desk
- Mitsuru Hirose – publicity coordination
- Office Moving – concert coordination
- Polydor Records.
  - Kazuyoshi Aoki – A&R
  - Osamu Takeuchi – backing vocals on "Haldyn Hotel" and "Coyote" (credited as "Michäel Saturnus"), assistant

Thanks

- Yasumasa Mishima, Yumiko Ohno, Masaya Abe, Mezame no Sato, Kei Fukuchi, Kazumi Sawaki, AC Unit, Ice Grey, Nobuyoshi Matsubara, Akira Ito, Aria, Casio, Signifie

== Release history ==
Date	Label(s)	Format	Catalog	Notes
September 1, 1989	Polydor K.K.	CD	HOOP-20343	
July 1, 2005	Universal Music Japan, Universal Sigma	Digital Download	none	
February 29, 2012	Chaos Union, Teslakite	CD	CHTE-0054	Remastered by Masanori Chinzei. Part of Disc 1 of the HALDYN DOME box set, alongside "Solar Ray (SPECTRUM 2 TYPE)" and "Bandiria Travellers [physical navigation version]". "Haldyn Hotel [Fractal Terrain Track]" is on Disc 3 (CHTE-0056); "Water in Time and Space (Full Size)" is on Disc 9 (CHTE-0062).
September 24, 2014	Universal Music Japan	SHM-CD	UPCY-6909	Part of Universal's "Project Archetype" (supervised by Osamu Takeuchi & Kasiko Takahasi). Remastered by Kenji Yoshino (supervised by Chinzei) with both original liner notes and new ones.

- "Haldyn Hotel", "Root of Spirit", "Coyote", "Frozen Beach" and "Venus" are included on the ADVANCED ROCK 3 promotional sampler.
- "Solar Ray (SPECTRUM 2 TYPE)" is the B-Side to the "World Turbine" single.
- "Haldyn Hotel [Fractal Terrain Track]" is the B-Side to the "Bandiria Travellers [Physical Navigation Version]" single.
- "Venus" is included on Detonator Orgun 2; "Water in Time and Space (Full Size)" and "Root of Spirit" are on the Detonator Orgun 3 soundtrack album.
- "Haldyn Hotel [Fractal Terrain Track]", "Root of Spirit", "Skeleton Coast Park" and "Venus" are included on the Root of Spirit～ESSENCE OF HIRASAWA SOLO WORKS～ compilation.
- "Haldyn Hotel" (and "Fractal Terrain Track"), "Root of Spirit", "Solar Ray (SPECTRUM 2 TYPE)", "Frozen Beach", "Water in Time and Space (Full Size)" and "Venus" are included on the Archetype | 1989–1995 Polydor years of Hirasawa compilation.

== See also ==
- 1989 in Japanese music
