= Virtual Rabbit =

Studio album by Susumu Hirasawa
- Released: May 25, 1991
- Recorded: November 1990 – January 1991
- Studio: Various: Key-Stone, Ōhashi, Meguro, Tokyo; GoldRush, Kojima, Taitō, Tokyo; Eggs, Oshino, Minamitsuru, Yamanashi; Music Inn Yamanakako, Yamanakako, Minamitsuru, Yamanashi
- Genre: Art pop; experimental pop; progressive pop; synthpop; world
- Length: 32:06
- Label: Polydor K.K.
- Producer: Susumu Hirasawa; Yūichi Kenjo (Executive)

Susumu Hirasawa chronology
The Ghost in Science (1990)	Virtual Rabbit (1991)	Aurora (1994)

Virtual Rabbit is the third studio album by Susumu Hirasawa, released on May 25, 1991, via Polydor K.K.

== Overview ==
Virtual Rabbit was made in the same style as the previous two albums, although greater in scale, with compositions more in line with Hirasawa's later solo work, and with a larger focus on orchestral styled instrumentation. It explores reality, religion, science, and dreams.

With this album, Hirasawa continued to streamline his production methods, reducing the use of guest musicians in the album almost completely to choral backing.

This was the first Hirasawa album to be engineered by Masanori Chinzei, who has since worked as engineer on all of Hirasawa's music.

== Track listing ==
All tracks are written by Susumu Hirasawa, except "Bandeira Travellers" with string & choral arrangements by Hirasawa & Kayo "Kokubo" Matsumoto.

No.	Title	Length
1.	"Stormy Sea" (嵐の海 Arashi no Umi)	3:32
2.	"Bandeira Travellers" (バンディリア旅行団 Bandiria Ryokōdan)	5:00
3.	"Hawk in my Heart, Don't Take The Moon Away [Planet Eagle]" (我が心の鷲よ 月を奪うな[プラネット・イーグル] Waga Shin no Washi yo, Tsuki wo Ubau na [Puranetto Īguru])	3:31
4.	"Virtual Rabbit" (ヴァーチュアル・ラビット Vāchuaru Rabitto)	3:15
5.	"Please Push "UNDO" Key" (UNDOをどうぞ UNDO wo Dōzo)	4:08
6.	"Clear Mountain Top" (山頂晴れて Sanchō Harete)	4:09
7.	"Quiet Sea" (静かの海 Shizuka no Umi)	3:25
8.	"Immortal Man" (死のない男 Shi no Nai Otoko)	2:56
9.	"A Tree Of Sun" (太陽の木 Taiyō no Ki)	5:55
10.	"Russian Tobiscope" (ロシアン・トビスコープ Roshian Tobisukōpu)	1:55

== Personnel ==
- Susumu Hirasawa – vocals, classical guitar, electric guitar, synthesizers, drum machine, sampler, sequencer, programming, acoustic piano (3), toy accordion (4), Amiga 2500 ("Say" program – Narration (5)), autoharp (7), production

additional musicians

- Tokyo Philharmonic Chorus – backing vocals (2)
- Teru Uchida Strings – strings (2)
- Toshihiko "BOB" Takahashi (courtesy of Alfa Records) – fretless bass (3, 9), backing vocals (5–6)
- Yasuchika Fujii and Kazuhiko Fujii (courtesy of Alfa Records) – backing vocals (5–6)
- Mamoru Kikuchi (credited as "WONDER WHO?") – narration/Old Man's voice (5)
- Jun Togawa (courtesy of Tōshiba EMI) – vocals (6)

technical

- Masanori Chinzei (Magnet) – recording & mixing engineer, backing vocals (4–6)
- Masaru Arai, Koreyuki Tanaka, Meiji Takamatsu, Shinji Kobayashi (Mix); Masanori Ihara, Tetsuto Kato (Gold Rush); Hideaki Tamura (Eggs); Yu Ishizaki, Motohiro Yamada (Music Inn) – second engineers
- Reiko Miyoshi (Tokyu Fun) – mastering engineer

visuals

- Kiyoshi Inagaki (Asset) – art director
- Hideki Namai – photography
- Kazunori Yoshida – hair & make-up
- Akemi Tsujitani – styling

operations

- I_{3} Promotion
  - Yūichi Kenjo – production, backing vocals (4–6)
  - Hiroki Yamaguchi – artist management, backing vocals (4–6)
  - Masami Fujii, Takeshi Fujita, Tsutomu Fukushima – artist management
  - Hiroyshi Mitomi, Shoko Mashio – publicity coordination
- Polydor K.K.
  - Kazuyoshi Aoki – A&R coordination
  - Osamu Takeuchi – director, backing vocals (4–6)

Thanks

- AC Unit, Ouija Ltd.

== Release history ==
Date	Label(s)	Format	Catalog	Notes
May 25, 1991	Polydor K.K.	CD	POCH-1084	
July 1, 2005	Universal Music Japan, Universal Sigma	Digital Download	none	
February 29, 2012	Chaos Union, Teslakite	CD	CHTE-0056	Remastered by Masanori Chinzei. Part of Disc 3 of the HALDYN DOME box set, alongside "Haldyn Hotel [Fractal Terrain Track]". "Bandeira Travellers [Physical Navigation Version]" is on Disc 1 (CHTE-0054).
September 24, 2014	Universal Music Japan	SHM-CD	UPCY-6911	Part of Universal's "Project Archetype" (supervised by Osamu Takeuchi & Kasiko Takahasi). Remastered by Kenji Yoshino (supervised by Chinzei) with both original liner notes and new ones.

- "Bandeira Travellers" is included on the Detonator Orgun Music Special sampler disc.
- "Bandeira Travellers [Physical Navigation Version]" and "Clear Mountain Top" are included, respectively, on the Detonator Orgun 1 and 2 soundtrack albums.
- "Stormy Sea", "Bandeira Travellers", "Virtual Rabbit" and "Clear Mountain Top" are included on the Root of Spirit～ESSENCE OF HIRASAWA SOLO WORKS～ compilation.
- "Stormy Sea", "Bandeira Travellers [Physical Navigation Version]", "Virtual Rabbit" and "Clear Mountain Top" are included on the Archetype | 1989–1995 Polydor years of Hirasawa compilation.
