= Siren (Susumu Hirasawa album) =

Studio album by Susumu Hirasawa
- Released: August 1, 1996
- Recorded: 1996: Shibuya; Akasaka; Karuizawa; Bangkok
- Genre: Art pop; electronica; techno-pop; world
- Length: 48:49
- Label: Nippon Columbia, TESLAKITE
- Producer: Susumu Hirasawa; Yūichi Kenjo (Executive)

Susumu Hirasawa chronology
Sim City (1995)	Siren (1996)	Technique of Relief (1998)

Singles from SIREN
- 1. "SAIREN *Siren*" Released: August 1, 1996 CODA-1012

Siren (/seɪrɛn/ SAY-ren, Japanese: セイレーン, romanized: Seirēn, lit. 'siren') is the sixth solo album by Susumu Hirasawa. It was released on August 1, 1996 by Nippon Columbia, with Hirasawa exclusively providing most of the instruments and production.

== Overview ==
As with the previous album Sim City, it was greatly influenced by Hirasawa's trips to Thailand and continues that album's style and concepts.

Starting from fertility goddesses and a "mermaid legend" he heard (possibly Suvannamaccha), Hirasawa investigated legends from around the world to see how much the ideals represented by the country's Kathoey gender role (with whom he spent most of his time in the country with) manifest in their myths, which led him to discover the same frequent pattern of fertility goddesses seducing humans and associations with gender variance or androgyny. He also interpreted such ideas as the Gemini myth and the concept of yin and yang as examples of things possessing attributes of both the masculine and feminine.

The conclusion that Hirasawa derived from his research is that no matter what culture one is from, the balance between masculinity and femininity is a valued concept. If this balance peacefully exists in one human being, they can be likened to a god in that respect, with Kathoey being the ideal example of this.

Although though this relatively abstract idea was the driving concept behind the album, Hirasawa tried to express it in a listener-friendly way through a story and easy to understand lyrics. He intended to evoke a primitive and naturalistic mythology based on harmony and coexistence with nature. For songwriting, Hirasawa elected to use as few English words as possible and avoid pop song-like structure, which imposed quite a bit of restriction on him. The process contained a large amount of experimentation and combination that rendered him more of a listener than a performer.

One of Hirasawa's aims with the album is to create music that will cause everyone who listens to it to be unified in action, which is reflected on the album's title: a play on the double meaning of "siren", which alludes to both the alarm mechanism and the mythological creatures. For Hirasawa, it was fascinating that people synchronize their actions with everyone else when a siren alarm goes off, and he found it similar to the way that men who hear the siren creature's song drop everything to sail in her direction.

== Track listing ==
All tracks are written by Susumu Hirasawa.

No.	Title	Length
1.	"ELECTRIC LIGHT BATHING-1" (電光浴-1 Denkōyoku-1)	1:12
2.	"SAIREN *Siren*" (サイレン *Siren*)	5:28
3.	"On Line Malaysia"	4:46
4.	"Siren *SEIREN*" (Siren *セイレーン*)	5:00
5.	"Nurse Cafe"	4:01
6.	"Holy Delay"	5:23
7.	"Gemini"	5:25
8.	"Day Scanner"	3:39
9.	"Siam Lights"	5:42
10.	"ELECTRIC LIGHT BATHING-2" (電光浴-2 Denkōyoku-2)	1:25
11.	"Mermaid Song"	7:03

2009 HQCD reissue bonus tracks ("SAIREN *Siren*" single B-sides)
No.	Title	Length
12.	"ELECTRIC LIGHT BATH" (電光浴 Denkōyoku) (default version)	2:47
13.	"SAIREN *Siren*" (サイレン *Siren*) (original karaoke) (オリジナル・カラオケ, orijinaru karaoke)	5:29

== Personnel ==
- Susumu Hirasawa – vocals, electric guitar, synthesizers, miburi, sampler, drum machine, amiga, sequencer, programming, production
- Sao praphet song – vocals (uncredited)
- Yūichi Kenjo – production (executive)
- Masanori Chinzei – engineering
- Yosuke Komatu – photography

== Release history ==
Date	Label(s)	Format	Catalog	Notes
August 1, 1996	Nippon Columbia, Teslakite	CD	COCA-13571	
March 18, 2009	Columbia Music Entertainment	HQCD	COCP-35524	Digitally remastered, with B-side alternative mixes for bonus tracks.
March 18, 2009	Columbia Music Entertainment	Digital Download	none	Digitally remastered, with B-side alternative mixes for bonus tracks.
February 29, 2012	Chaos Union, Teslakite	CD	CHTE-0059	Remastered by Masanori Chinzei. Part of Disc 6 of the HALDYN DOME box set, alongside "Electric Light Bath (default version)".

- "Siren *Seiren*" (titled "Siren"), "Gemini" and "Sairen *Siren*" (titled "M-2") were included in the "Hospital" album digest cassette.
- "Sairen *Siren*", "Siren *Seiren*" and "Nurse Cafe" were included in the "Siren – Promotion Enhanced CD" promotional enhanced CD.
