= Jun Miyake =

Japanese composer (born 1958)

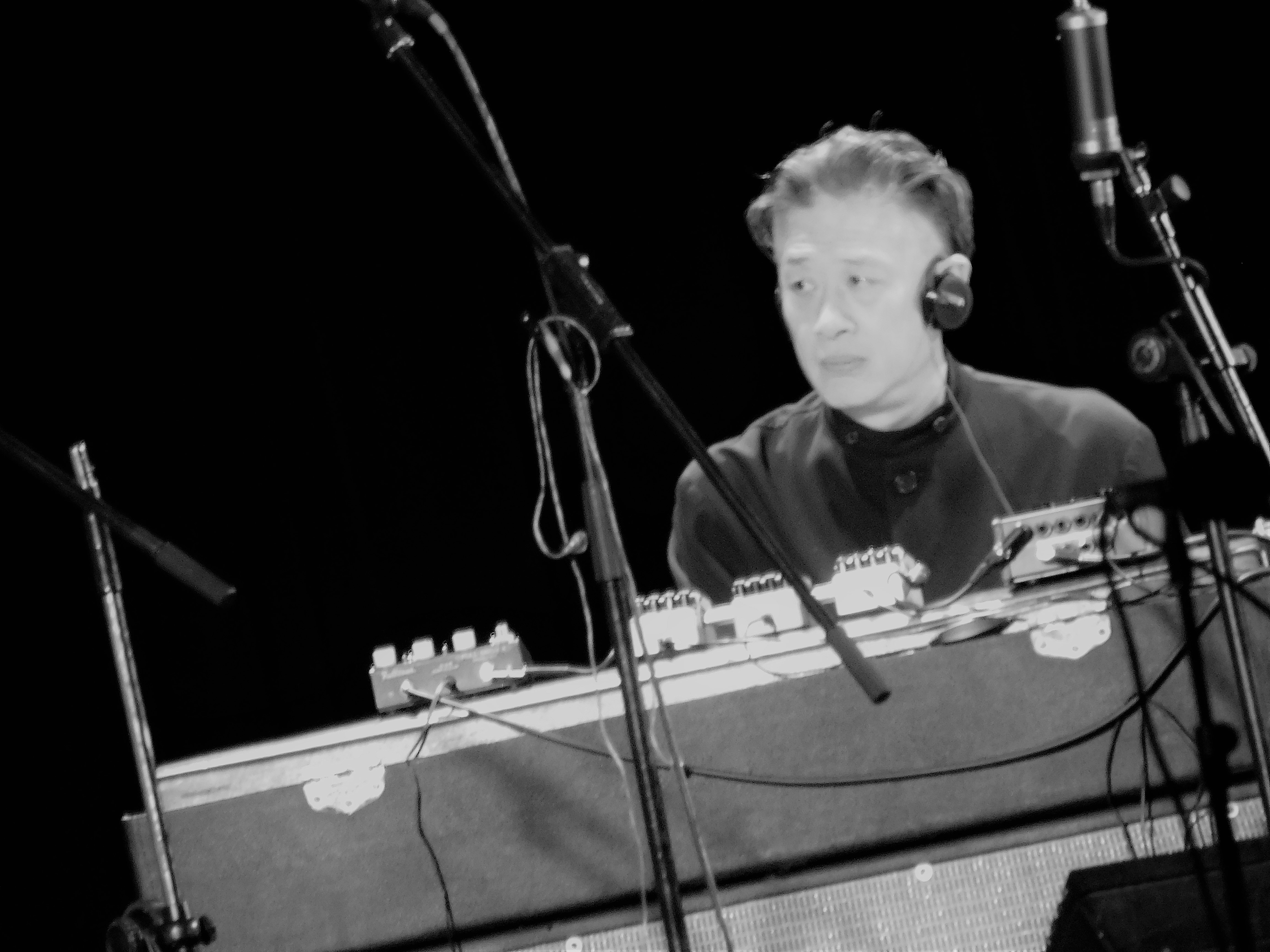

Background information
- Born: January 7, 1958 (age 68); Kyoto, Japan
- Genres: Hybrid
- Instruments: Jazz trumpet, Flugelhorn, Piano, Fender Rhodes
- Website: www.junmiyake.com

Jun Miyake (Japanese: 三宅 純 Hepburn: Miyake Jun, January 7, 1958, in Kyoto) is a Japanese composer. His music (e.g., the songs "Lilies in the Valley" and "The Here and After") was used in the film Pina, nominated for the Academy Awards for Best Documentary Feature in January 2012. He has also been awarded by the German critic's award, Der Preis der deutschen Schallplattenkritik, as Best Album of the Year for his last three albums, Stolen from Strangers, Lost Memory Theatre act-1, and Lost Memory Theatre act-2. Miyake has now released 17 solo albums, and has worked on films, documentaries, dances, advertisement, and theatre pieces. His main instruments include the trumpet, flugelhorn, melodica, piano, keyboard, fender rhodes, and programming.

== Career ==
Miyake was discovered by Japanese jazz trumpeter Terumasa Hino. He studied at Berklee College of Music from 1976 to 1981; in 1981, he won the prize at the Massachusetts Artist Foundation award for his composition.

After returning to Tokyo, he became a working musician, composer, and producer. In 1983, he released his first album "June Night Love", which includes two tracks used in the TDK TV commercial starring Andy Warhol. He would work on over 3,000 TV commercials, winning awards including Cannes advertisement film festival and the Digital Media Grands prix.

Miyake worked closely with Pina Bausch for pieces including Rough Cut (2005), Vollmond (2006), Sweet Mambo (2008), Como El Musguito En La Piedra, Ay Si Si... (2009), which led to the film Pina by Wim Wenders; his tracks were featured in the essential scenes. This film was awarded by European Film Award 2011 as Best Documentary; nominated for the Academy Awards 2012 as Best Documentary Feature,[4] and BAFTA 2012 as Best non-English language film. With Katsuhiro Otomo in 1995, he composed the soundtrack of the episode "Stink Bomb" for the anime Memories, where he uses a combination of jazz and funk to emphasize the film's chaotic and comedic nature.

He has also worked closely with Robert Wilson on White Town (2002), an homage to Arne Jacobsen at Bellevue Teatret in Copenhagen; Jean-Paul Goude who has done the artwork for Stolen from Strangers, Lost Memory Theatre act-1, Lost Memory Theatre act-2, Oliver Stone, and Philippe Decouflé, among others, as well as collaborations with artists such as Hal Willner, Arto Lindsay, Peter Scherer, Arthur H, Vinicius Cantuaria, Cosmic voice of Bulgaria, David Byrne, Grace Jones, Gavin Friday, Nina Hagen, Ron Carter, Michael Brecker, David Sanborn, Al Foster, Dhafer Youssef, Vincent Segal, Remi Kolpa Kopoul, Jean-Michel Jarre, and many others.

From 2005, he has set a base in Paris, actively working on several projects. He has been selected as "Man of 2009" by Galeries Lafayette Homme.

In 2016, he arranged the Japanese national anthem Kimigayo for 2016 Summer Olympics closing ceremony; composed the track "ANTHEM OUTRO" for the "ARIGATO FROM JAPAN" sequence, which became the topic of conversation.

In recent years, his has worked for film scores including The Translators, Norman- The Moderate Rise and Tragic Fall of a New York Fixer, An Artist of the Floating World, No Longer Human, No.9, Sanson, and Snow Country.

In 2021, he has released his most recent solo album "Whispered Garden".

After coming back to Tokyo during the pandemic, Miyake decided on moving his base to New York in 2024.

== Discography ==
- 1983 – "JUNE NIGHT LOVE (TDK RECORDS)
- 1984 – "Especially Sexy (TDK RECORDS)
- 1988 – "TOKOSHIE no TENOHIRA 〈永遠乃掌 〉 (SWITCH RECORDS)
- 1989 – Cycloid / Stokesia (FUNHOUSE)
- 1989 – "Gorilla original soundtrack"
- 1991 – ONE (PONY CANYON)
- 1991 – "Sublime&JUN MIYAKE / RECIENTE (WEA MUSIC)
- 1991 – "zans / La Party (NIPPON COLUMBIA)
- 1993 – "ENTROPATHY 〈星ノ玉ノ緒〉 (SONY RECORDS)
- 1996 – "JUN MIYAKE CM TRACKS VOL.1 (SLC RECORDS)
- 1996 – "JUN MIYAKE CM TRACKS VOL.2 (SLC RECORDS)
- 1996 – 常夏乃憂ヒ JUN MIYAKE LIVE at CAY '95 (SAIDERA RECORDS)
- 1997 – "Latinism Reversible (TOKUMA JAPAN COMMUNICATIONS)
- 1998 – "angels rondo" MUSIC for TAKAYUKI TERAKADO EXHIBITION (TERAPIKA RECORDS)
- 1998 – "PuPu the soundtrack (Little More records)"
- 1999 – "Glam Exotica ! (BEAMS RECORDS)
- 2000 – "Mondo Erotica ! (BEAMS RECORDS)
- 2000 – "Innocent Bossa in the mirror (BEAMS RECORDS/CONSIPIO RECORDS)
- 2004 – "MASK DE 41 Original Soundtrack (Little More records)"
- 2006 – "Kiba Original Soundtrack vol.1(Aniplex)"
- 2007 – "Stolen from strangers (drApe/P-VINE, enja-yellowbird)
- 2007 – "Kiba Original Soundtrack vol.2(Aniplex)"
- 2009 – "The Miraculous Mandarin (Parco)"
- 2009 – "Vollmond music from the dance theater of Pina Bausch (VideoArts)"
- 2010 – "Jeanne d'arc Soundtrack (Pony Canyon)"
- 2010 – "Sublime&JUN MIYAKE / LUDIC (drApe/P-VINE, enja-yellowbird)
- 2011 – Pina by Wim Wenders Soundtrack (Wenders Music)
- 2013 – "Lost Memory Theatre act-1 (drApe/P-VINE, enja-yellowbird)
- 2014 – "Woyzeck (Pony Canyon)
- 2014 – "9 Days Queen (Pony Canyon)
- 2014 – Lost Memory Theatre act-2 (drApe/P-VINE, enja-yellowbird)
- 2017 – "Last Picture – Dairo Miyamoto (drApe/P-VINE, enja-yellowbird)
- 2017 – "NORMAN: The Moderate Rise and Tragic Fall of a New York Fixer Original Soundtrack"
- 2018 – "Lost Memory Theatre act-3 (drApe/P-VINE, enja-yellowbird)
- 2019 – "COLOMENA / Kyoko Katsunuma & Jun Miyake (drApe/P-VINE)
- 2019 – "An artist of floating world Original Soundtrack (drApe/P-VINE)
- 2019 – "No Longer Human Original Soundtrack (drApe/P-VINE)
- 2019 – 'Les Traducteurs Original Soundtrack (drApe/P-VINE)"
- 2020 – Mémoires du Sapa Original Soundtrack (drApe/P-VINE)"
- 2021 – "No.9 -Immortal Melody Soundtrack (e+ Music)"
- 2021 – "Sanson Original Soundtrack (drApe/P-VINE)"
- 2021 – "Whispered Garden (drApe/P-VINE, enja-yellowbird)
- 2022 – "Snow Country Original Soundtrack (drApe/P-VINE) "
- 2023 – "Jeanne d'arc Soundtrack" (P-VINE)
- 2025 - "Siddhartha" (P-VINE)

=== Films ===
- 1987 – "Itoshi no Half Moon" – Yōjirō Takita
- 1995 – Stink Bomb – "Memories" – Katsuhiro Otomo
- 1998 – "The Story of Pupu" – Kensaku Watanabe
- 1999 – Any Given Sunday – Oliver Stone – Didn't come through the final cut
- 2004 – Mask de 41 – Taishi Muramoto
- 2005 – Coffee with Pina – Lee Yanor
- 2006 – L'Ombre et la Main – Laurence Garret
- 2006 – "Kiba"
- 2009 – Mourir d'Aimer – Josse Dayan
- 2010 – Katai – Claire Doyon
- 2010 – 3 femmes amoureuses – Pierre Daigniere
- 2010 – The Women – Diane English
- 2011 – Jonas – Christian Ulmen & Robert Wilde
- 2011 – Eat Pray Love – Ryan Murphy
- 2011 – Pina – Wim Wenders (Awarded for European Film Award 2011, Nominee for the Academy Awards 2012, BAFTA awards 2012)
- 2014 – Tiens-toi droite – Katia Lewkowicz
- 2016 – Norman:The Moderate Rise and Tragic Fall of a New York Fixer (film) – Joseph Cedar
- 2019 – The Translators-{Regis Roinsard}
- 2019 – "An artist of floating world (Kazutaka Watanabe)}
- 2019 – "No Longer Human (Mika Ninagawa)}
- 2022 – "Snow Country (Kazutaka Watanabe)}
- 2023 – "Oxygen Station (Ivan Tymchenko)}
- 2023 – "Some Body comes into the Light" (Wim Wenders)

=== Theater pieces ===
- 2000 – Philippe Decoufle / improvisational session / Palais de Chaillot
- 2002 – Robert Wilson / "Whitetown" / Bellevue Theatret (Copenhagen)
- 2002 – Philippe Decoufle / Iris workshop / Yokohama
- 2005 – Philippe Decoufle / Solo / Paris
- 2005 – Pina Bausch / Rough Cut / Wuppertal
- 2005 – Katrine Wiedman / The Mermaid / Copenhagen
- 2005 – Philippe Decoufle / Theatre Mogador/ Paris
- 2006 – Pina Bausch / Rough Cut / Wuppertal
- 2007 – Pina Bausch / Bamboo Blues / Wuppertal
- 2007 – Brecht-Weill / The Threepenny Opera / Akira Shirai / Tokyo
- 2008 – Pina Bausch /Sweet Mambo / Wuppertal
- 2009 – Shuji Terayama / The Miraculous Mandarin / Akira Shirai / Tokyo
- 2010 – Philippe Ridley / Leaves of Glass / Akira Shirai / Tokyo
- 2010 – Kazuki Nakajima / Jeanne d'Arc / Akira Shirai / Tokyo
- 2011 – Paul Auster / Ghosts / Akira Shirai / Tokyo
- 2011 – Kyoka Izumi / Tenshu Monogatari / Akira Shirai / Tokyo
- 2012 – Georg Büchner / WOYZECK / Akira Shirai / Tokyo
- 2013 – Go Aoki / 9 Days Queen / Akira Shirai / Tokyo
- 2014 – Jun Miyake / Lost Memory Theatre / Akira Shirai / Yokohama
- 2015 – Pearl S. Buck / PEARL / Lincoln Center / New York (unfinished master has been used illegally)
- 2015 – No.9 Melody Immortality / Akira Shirai / Tokyo
- 2020 – Flying Sapa / Kumiko Ueda
- 2021 – No.9 Melody Immortality / Akira Shirai / Tokyo
- 2021 – Sanson / Akira Shirai
- 2023 – Jeanne d'arc / Akira Shirai
- 2024 -Siddhartha / Akira Shirai
