= The Ghost in Science =

Studio album by Susumu Hirasawa
- Released: May 25, 1990
- Recorded: January – March 1990
- Studios: Key-Stone Studio, Ōhashi, Meguro, Tokyo; Kitty Izu Studio, Yawatano, Itō, Shizuoka
- Genres: Art pop; new-age; new wave; world
- Length: 44:22
- Label: Polydor K.K.
- Producers: Akiro "Kamio" Arishima; Susumu Hirasawa (co.); Yūichi Kenjo (co.)

Susumu Hirasawa chronology
Water in Time and Space (1989)	The Ghost in Science (1990)	Virtual Rabbit (1991)

Singles from The Ghost in Science
- 1. "World Turbine" Released: May 25, 1990 PODH-1008

The Ghost In Science (サイエンスの幽霊, Saiensu no Yūrei) is the second studio album by Susumu Hirasawa. It was released on May 25, 1990 via Polydor K.K.

== Overview ==
The Ghost in Science is marked by a whimsical, futuristic thematic in which Hirasawa paints himself as a mad scientist. It has a sound similar to other Hirasawa albums of the same era, though puts greater emphasis on electronic elements.

== Track listing ==
All tracks are written and arranged by Susumu Hirasawa except "Fish Song", cowritten by Akiro "Kamio" Arishima with strings coarranged by Kayo "Kokubo" Matsumoto.

No.	Title	Length
1.	"World Turbine" (世界タービン Sekai Tābin)	4:03
2.	"Rocket" (ロケット Roketto)	3:31
3.	"Fish Song" (フィッシュ・ソング Fisshu Songu)	6:06
4.	"Cowboy and Indian" (カウボーイとインディアン Kaubōi to Indian)	2:50
5.	"QUIT"	6:50
6.	"Amor Buffer" (アモール・バッファー Amōru Baffā) (instrumental)	1:29
7.	"Dreaming Machine" (夢みる機械 Yume Miru Kikai)	3:24
8.	"Techno Girl" (テクノの娘 Tekuno no Musume)	3:47
9.	"FGG"	2:22

- "QUIT" contains a sample of "Haldyn Hotel", from the album Water in Time and Space.

== Personnel ==
- Susumu Hirasawa - vocals, guitars, bass (on "Fish Song"), timpani, percussion, autoharp, synthesizers, drum machine, sampler, sequencer, Amiga 2500 ("Say" program - Dreaming Machine voice on "QUIT"), programming, arrangements, co-production, computer graphics

additional musicians

- Tuan Chin Kuan - voice (sampled) in "World Turbine"
- Kaoru Kinjo - female vocals on "World Turbine"
- Jun Togawa (courtesy of Baidis Records) - backing vocals on "Rocket" & "Cowboy and Indian"
- Kazuhide "Kitune" Akimoto (Varichef Homium) - backing vocals on "Rocket", bass on "Fish Song"
- Yūichi Hirasawa, Katsuhiko Akiyama (Here is Eden), Yuji Oda, Shigeru Fujishima, Masahiro Furukawa - backing vocals on "Rocket"
- Shingo Tomoda - drums on "Fish Song"
- Midori Ayabe, Hiroki Yamamoto, Nagisa Kiriyama and Yoshiaki Funayama - violin on "Fish Song" and "Techno Girl"
- Kaori Kurimaru and Rika Morozumi - viola on "Fish Song" and "Techno Girl"
- Hirohisa Miyata and Makoto Ohsawa - cello on "Fish Song" and "Techno Girl"
- Kazutoki Umezu - alto saxophone and noise on "Cowboy and Indian"
- Mamoru Kikuchi - Old Man's voice on "QUIT"
- Hisashi "Dr. Ochanomizu" Katsuta - Laughing voice on "QUIT"
- Kayo "Kokubo" Matsumoto - voice on "Techno Girl"

technical

- Akiro Kamio Arishima - production
- Yoshiaki Kondo (Gok Sound) - recording & mixing engineer
- Meiji Takamatsu (Mix) - second engineer

visuals

- Kiyoshi Inagaki (Asset) - art director
- Naoki Wada (CG), Yosuke Komatu - photography
- Yoshihiro Ariga - costume
- Akemi Tsujitani - styling
- Junko Maeda - hair & make-up

operations

- I_{3} Promotion
  - Yūichi Kenjo - co-production, backing vocals on "Rocket"
  - Masami Fujii, Hiroyoshi Mitomi - artist management
- Tsutomu Fukushima - stage director
- Hiroki Yamaguchi - assistant
- Katsuyuki Sawafuji - publicity coordination
- Polydor K.K.
  - Kazuyoshi Aoki - A&R coordinator
  - Osamu Takeuchi - backing vocals on "Rocket", director

Thanks

- AC Unit, Sky Corporation, Mamoru Kimura Office, Toshikazu Tamura, Keiji Kimura, Masaya Abe, Sazaby's Furniture

== Release history ==
Date	Label(s)	Format	Catalog	Notes
May 25, 1990	Polydor K.K.	CD	POCH-1009	
July 1, 2005	Universal Music Japan, Universal Sigma	Digital Download	none	
February 29, 2012	Chaos Union, Teslakite	CD	CHTE-0055	Remastered by Masanori Chinzei. Disc 2 of the HALDYN DOME box set.
September 24, 2014	Universal Music Japan	SHM-CD	UPCY-6910	Part of Universal's "Project Archetype" (supervised by Osamu Takeuchi & Kasiko Takahasi). Remastered by Kenji Yoshino (supervised by Chinzei) with both original liner notes and new ones.

- "Techno Girl" is included on the AD.POLICE - DRAGON TRIP drama CD.
- "Fish Song" is the B-Side to the "Root of Spirit" single.
- "Rocket" and "Fish Song" were included on the Root of Spirit～ESSENCE OF HIRASAWA SOLO WORKS～ compilation.
- "World Turbine", "Rocket", "Fish Song", "Dreaming Machine" and "Techno Girl" were included on the Archetype | 1989-1995 Polydor years of Hirasawa compilation.

== See also ==
- 1990 in Japanese music
