= List of One-Punch Man characters =

The Japanese manga series One-Punch Man contains a number of fictional characters created by One and illustrated by Yusuke Murata. The series follows a superhero named Saitama and his disciple Genos who join the Hero Association so they can be recognized as such when they fight various monsters and supervillains. The Hero Association ranks all of its members by a Class and a ranking within that class. The following characters listed are ones noted by the author in the manga profiles, ones that were highlighted in the anime character list, and ones that recur over several story arcs.

== Main characters ==
=== Saitama ===
The title protagonist, Saitama (サイタマ; 埼玉), is a 25-year-old man who has become bored with fighting because he can defeat most opponents with a single punch.^{Vol. 1} Three years prior to the start of the series, Saitama was job hunting and lacked a sense of purpose when he defeats the monster Crablante while protecing a child.^{Ch. 2} Following this encounter, he decided to become a hero "for the fun of it".^{Ch. 5} Saitama possesses superhuman strength, speed, and durability. He attributes his abilities to a three-year daily training regimen consisting of 100 push-ups, 100 sit-ups, 100 squats, a 10 km run, although he does not otherwise know the origin of his power.^{Ch. 11} Early in the series, Genos becomes his disciple and roommate. ^{Vol. 1}

Saitama enters the Hero Association with a score of 71. Despite achieving exceptional results in the physical portion of the entrance examination, his poor performance on the mental exam results in a low initial ranking.^{Web ch. 16-17,}^{Ch. 16} He subsequently rises through the Association's ranks, although some of his achievements are credited to other heroes or go unrecognized. In the webcomic, he is eventually promoted to A-Class rank 39 and becomes a leader of the Hero Name Victim Association, a group that campaigns for its members to receive different hero names. Throughout the series, Saitama develops relationships with several other heroes, including Mumen Rider, Bang, King, Genos, and Blizzard. His registered hero name is Bald Cape (ハゲマント, Hagemanto; Anime: Caped Baldy).^{Ch. 45}

Saitama is voiced by Makoto Furukawa in the original Japanese version and by Max Mittelman in the English dub.

=== Genos ===
Genos (ジェノス, Jenosu) is a 19-year-old cyborg who becomes Saitama's disciple after bearing witness to Saitama's easy victory over Mosquito Girl.^{Web ch. 6-7,}^{Ch. 6-7} Four years prior to the start of the storyline, his family was killed by a rampaging cyborg known as Mad Cyborg. Genos was nearly killed in the attack and his body was destroyed, so to keep him alive, a scientist named Dr. Kuseno took Genos in and modified his body to make him a cyborg with destructive capabilities. Ever since, Genos has been fighting evil while searching for clues about the Mad Cyborg for revenge. He is cool-headed and quick-witted, and remains extremely determined to improve himself; he has an overly mature side as well as a naive side. Dr. Kuseno has shown concern for him, and his reply is: in this battle, he and the doctor are one. ^{Web ch. 7,}^{Ch. 7} His perfect score on the entrance exam for the Hero Association places him in the highest class, S-Class, far above Saitama's placement in C-Class, but he still considers Saitama to be his master and goes with him whenever he is not summoned to other missions.^{Web ch. 16-17,}^{Vol. 3-4} He lives with Saitama after offering a sizable down payment for his share of the rent.^{Ch. 18} His superhero name in the Hero Association is Demon Cyborg (鬼サイボーグ, Oni Saibōgu)^{Ch. 45}

Genos is voiced by Kaito Ishikawa in the original Japanese version and by Zach Aguilar in the English dub.

== Hero Association ==
The Hero Association (ヒーロー協会, Hīrō Kyōkai) is a superhero organization founded by the multi-millionaire Agoni in order to fight monsters, criminals, and various threats. It uses a Hero Registry to indicate which characters are recognized as professional heroes, with anyone who is not registered to be considered "a pervy freak who spouts irresponsible nonsense". Agoni created the association after his grandson was saved from the monster Crablante by an unknown bystander (who turns out to be Saitama). It is also financed by donations from citizens.^{Ch. 15} The association is made up of four tiers from the lowest C-Class to the highest S-Class. The heroes within each class are ranked numerically, with the first ranked hero of each class being eligible to advance to the next tier if they so desire.^{Vol. 4} The new heroes must take an exam in which 50% is a physical test, and the other 50% is a written exam and an essay. A passing grade would be 70% or higher and directly placed in a class from 70% being barely C-class to 100% being eligible for S-Class.^{Ch. 16} They are then placed at the lowest ranking for that tier.^{Ch. 16} Heroes can ascend or descend in their rankings depending on their deeds.^{Vol. 3}

=== S-Class Heroes ===
S-Class is the highest hero rank in the Hero Association. Those who have gotten a perfect score on the entrance exam, as well as the top candidate from A-Class, are eligible to enter this class.^{Ch. 16, 23} Besides Genos, the S-Class heroes in the series are, in rank order:

==== Blast ====
Blast (ブラスト, Burasuto) is the top superhero in the Hero Association who can also use a teleportation suit. His whereabouts are currently unknown and it is said to make himself known when a threat to humanity arises.^{Ch. 30} He is revealed to be part of a group of universal guardians who had for years been hunting down a series of mysterious God cubes which scattered across the universe including planet Earth, in order to prevent people from coming into contact with the cubes and becoming Mysterious Beings. Among the members Blast team-up with resembles one of Saitama's past foes, such as Boros and Beast King. The reason behind this ongoing hunt for the cubes is because of his partner and brother in-law, a would be ninja village founder at Saitama's world, Empty Void ends up being manipulated by God, following the death of latter's sister, Maya, whom Blast married.^{Ch. 201}^{Ch. 244} Terrible Tornado and Sitch were some of the first people to know who he is and what he looks like.^{Wc-Ch. 106} Blast once fought Centichoro, a powerful, giant centipede, and brought it to the brink of death.^{Ch. 84} He fought his former partner Empty Void and rendered him comatose 15 years ago and, also, massacred most students who already being influenced by their masters in self-defense. ^{Wc-Ch. 115} He also saved Amai Mask and became his idol.^{Ch. 135} He first met his fellow member and a would be brother in-law, Void when one of his disciple turned into a monster by the God's cube. After falling in love with Void's sister, Maya, Blast and Maya got married and gave a birth of a son named Blue. Suddenly, Maya died in a certain incident, and Void ended up being manipulated by God as well, leaving a widowed Blast raised Blue alone prior both father and son begun to have strain relationships at some point.^{255 - 256 (Old)}

During the Hero Association's assault on the Monster Association's headquarters in the present, Blast finally appears to take one of God's cubes which Saitama found at a collapsing underground location where Saitama is trapped alongside Flashy Flash and a one-eyed female monster named Manako. Blast helps the two heroes and the small monster out of the rubble.^{Ch. 183} When God attempts to corrupt Tornado by mimicking Blast's appearance, Tornado is able to resist it as the real Blast is nearby, which causes God to retreat. Because his mission hunting the cubes is very important, Blast had been rarely available during the Hero Association's tasks. ^{Ch. 201}

After Garo's redemption on the same day of the beginning of Neo Heroes' rises, he and Sitch are working to revert surviving monsterized humans back to normals while explaining to Saitama and his allies about his ongoing hunts for the cubes, starting from his former partner.^{Ch. 240}^{Ch. 241} By luck, his reunion with Void went smoothly, when he witness Saitama is able to return his partner's humanity, easily. Ahead God's bigger moves, both Blast and Void are planning to recruit Saitama when needed against their true enemy.^{246 - 248}

Blue, Blast and Maya's son also becomes a co-founder of Neo Heroes and wants to surpass his father, ever since losing his mother, when he was a child.^{Wc-Ch. 121} Should be replaced as number one by Saitama.

==== Tatsumaki ====
Terrible Tornado (戦慄のタツマキ, Senritsu no Tatsumaki), at rank 2, is the top female superhero in the Hero Association.^{Ch. 30} She is a 28-year-old woman with emerald green hair that curls at the ends. Her youthful appearance and short stature leads others to confuse her for a lost little girl.^{Ch. 30, Vol. 9 bonus} As an esper, she can perform psychic maneuvers such as telekinesis^{Ch. 30} and levitation.^{Ep. 6} She has a younger sister named Fubuki.^{Vol. 3 bonus} In the battle with the Dark Matter Thieves, she easily turns a multitude of shells shot from a large alien ship back onto itself, dealing tremendous damage.^{Ch. 34-35} Other espers are generally dwarfed by her overpowering telekinesis, and she has an extremely short temper, often lashing out at people.^{Ch. 37} Blast is the only individual who Tatsumaki sees in high regard and she awaits his return.^{Ch. 106} She owed Blast for saving her life and renewed her motivation to protect her only family, Blizzard.^{Ch. 137}

Tatsumaki is voiced by Aoi Yūki in the original Japanese version. In the English dub, she is voiced by Marieve Herington in Season 1 and Corina Boettger in Season 2 onwards.

==== Bang ====
Bang (バング, Bangu), who goes by the hero name Silverfang (シルバーファング, Shirubā Fangu; anime: Silver Fang), at rank 3, is an expert martial artist who runs a dojo in City Z.^{Web ch. 20,}^{Ch. 21} Back when he was young, Bang used to utilize a forbidden martial arts style "Fist of Unleashed Explosive" (爆心解放拳/解き放たれた爆薬の拳, Bakushin Kaihō-ken/Tokihanata Reta Bakuyaku no Ken) and used it selfishly until his brother, Bomb, redeems him. Inspired by his brother's fighting style, Bang abandoned the forbidden style and invented "Fist of Flowing Water Crushing Rock" (流水砕岩の拳, Ryūsui Saigan no Ken) with a similar caliber as the style Bomb uses, and joins Hero Association in the present prior to Saitama's registration to the organization. Thanks to Bomb, Bang becomes wise and displays a great deal of patience when compared to others in S-Class, and often scolds other heroes for being haughty or selfish, just as he was back in his youth.^{Ch. 150} His sole student is Charanko, as he had a former disciple named Garo who beat down his other students including Sourface until they quit, and Bang was too late to stop Garo from learning his former fighting style. The incident of Garo walking a similar path as Bang had is a painful memory for the latter, and as a result, he constantly looks for new disciples to pass his martial arts on to, as Charanko is fairly incompetent.^{Vol. 6} He is one of the first heroes to recognize Saitama's true power, witnessing him destroying a meteor that would otherwise destroy Z-City.^{Vol. 8} After Future Garo sends Future Saitama to stop the former's past-self and successfully redeems him, Bang reconciles with his former student, and helps his rehabilitation while retiring from the association, at the same time that his dojo is also re-opened once again.^{Ch. 236}

Bang is voiced by Kazuhiro Yamaji in the original Japanese version and by John DeMita and later Cory Yee in the English dub.

==== Kamikaze ====
Kamikaze (カミカゼ/神風)^{Ch. 69}, who goes by his hero name Atomic Samurai (アトミックサムライ/アトミック侍, Atomikku Samurai), rank 4, is a samurai hero who sports a kimono with an atom symbol on the back of it, as well as a member of the Council of Swordsmasters. He initially refuses to shake Saitama's hand as he isn't S-Class. When Saitama calls him "middle-aged", he replies that he is only 37.^{Ch. 30} Atomic Samurai is highly skilled with his katana, being able to cut enemies down into millions of pieces in an instant. Within confined spaces, he wields his sword with such precision and speed that enemies are deatomized. He has several students who fill A-Class ranks 2, 3, and 4. He is part of a group called the Holy Order Of The Sword, along with Nichirin, Amahare, and Zanbai, each an exceptionally skilled sword-wielder.^{Ch. 68} After the deaths of previous swordsmen trios at the hands of a toxic form of a monster Fuhrer Ugly, Kamikaze is entrusted by a dying Nichirin with one of the two Sacred Blades, the Sun Blade, and becoming a new leader of the order, with a mission to search Moon Blade, once the war against Monster Association is over.^{Ch. 148}

Atomic Samurai is voiced by Kenjiro Tsuda in the original Japanese version and by Kyle Hebert in the English dub.

==== Isamu ====
Isamu (イサム), also known by his hero name, Child Emperor (童帝, Dou Tei), rank 5, is a ten-year-old boy who wears a Japanese-style elementary school backpack. To his dismay however, he is one of the heroes other than Saitama to be given an embarrassing hero name by Hero Association.^{Ch. 30, 31, 190}. He is one of the group of genius child prodigy, and an inventor who uses robots to fight as well as using his backpack to sprout spider-like legs that enable him to ambulate.^{Ch. 35, 67} In the bonus chapter "Numbers", he devises a mask which functions as a scanner for the heroes and monsters' power levels.^{Vol. 10 bonus} In Vol. 12, he fights a giant Medusa-like monster Ganriki with Underdog Man.^{Ch. 67} Various other gadgets have been displayed, each with a unique function tailored to fighting certain enemies. Though he is the youngest of the S-Class heroes, he displays a level of maturity exceeding most of his peers'. He was formerly Dr. Bofoi's assistant.^{Ch. 149} Following the Monster Association's downfall, as well as Garo's redemption, and Hero Association's current financial situation, Isamu initial defect alongside Darkshine and Metal Bat to Neo Heroes during its first rise, before finding out there is a conspiracy connection between it, Bofoi, and one of enhanced non-human creatures.

Child Emperor is voiced by Minami Takayama in the original Japanese version and by Sara Cravens in the English dub.

===== Underdog Man =====
Underdog Man (負け犬の男/カマセイヌマン, Makeinu no Otoko/Kamaseinu Man) is a group of humanoid dog robots that assist their creator Child Emperor. They come in different variants. Any three Underdog Man robots can combine to form Mad Dog Underdog Cerberus.^{Ch. 67}

- Underdog Man #22 self-destructed after grabbing Eyesight.^{Ch. 67}
- Underdog Man #22, #23, and #24 were used to fight G5 and were defeated in their Mad Dog Underdog Cerberus form.^{Ch. 101}

==== Bofoi ====
Dr. Bofoi (ボフォイ博士, Bofoi Hakase), who goes by the hero name Metal Knight (メタルナイト, Metaru Naito) is a scientist who uses various remote-controlled robots to fight with high destructive capability. His robot first appears at Z City, where he tests a new weapon against an incoming meteor, but it fails while also turning down a collaboration with Genos. He is introduced as S-Class, Rank 7,^{Ch. 21} but after being credited for stopping the meteor, advances to rank 6.^{Web ch. 20-22,}^{Ch. 22} He is absent at most S-Class meetings,^{Ch. 30} but his robots often appear to salvage parts from destroyed enemies.^{Ch. 37} Drive Knight advises Genos to be wary of Metal Knight, hinting at a connection between Dr. Bofoi and the cyborg that destroyed one of the hometowns where Genos, Drive Knight and Kuseno used to live respectively.^{Ch. 35} Dr. Bofoi reconstructs the Hero Association building into a fortress.^{Vol. 7 bonus}

Metal Knight is voiced by Tesshō Genda in the original Japanese version and by Jamieson Price in the English dub.^{Ep. 7 credits}

==== King ====
King (王/キング, Ō/Kingu), ranked 7 at the time of the S-class meeting, is a hero with large claw-scars down the left side of his face.^{Ch. 30} The association believes that he is the strongest man on the planet and that the other S-class members show him great respect.^{Ch. 32} In actuality, he is an ordinary 29-year-old otaku lacking superpowers and loves playing dating sims and fighting games. When King was younger, he was attacked by a Tiger-level monster which clawed his face. But when a younger Saitama defeated it, King was given credit, due to Saitama's lack of registration with the Hero Association. Other similar "victories" depicted show that Saitama and other circumstances cause high-level demons to die near him, and he often receives all the credit. As a result, he was placed in S-Class. King did not protest due to the S-Class perks and wealth, soon becoming one of the most popular heroes. King is often targeted by monsters and assassins; however, due to his luck, his enemies overestimate him and end up running away because of his presence. People have given his special technique a nickname, the "King Engine", which in actuality is his heart beating so loudly and quickly that enemies are scared away. Although Saitama knows of King's lack of abilities, he does not mind giving King the credit while encouraging King to keep inspiring people as an S-Class hero. King and Saitama become friends and often visit each other to play video games. As he was present during Saitama's past life when the latter saved his life, King is the only person who remembers when Saitama had hair, prior to the latter acquiring his powers at the cost of baldness.^{Vol. 8}

King is voiced by Hiroki Yasumoto in the original Japanese version and by Rich Brown in the English dub.

==== Zombieman ====
Zombieman (ゾンビマン, Zonbiman), at rank 8, is a zombie hero with short black hair and wears a jacket.^{Ch. 30} He is a practically immortal hero who can regenerate from any wound. It is later revealed that he was a former test subject of the House of Evolution, having planned to get revenge on them until he abandoned his personal matter when he learned Saitama is the main reason the organization have fallen, and reformed as a food shop.^{Ch. 89} He is also one of Isamu's closest friend and acquaintance.

His innate fighting abilities are nonexistent compared to those of the other S-Class heroes, so he utilizes his regeneration for unconventional tactics that pinpoint the opponent's weaknesses. Battles against him often devolve into wars of attrition.

Zombieman is voiced by Takahiro Sakurai in the original Japanese version and by Vernon Dew in the English dub.

==== Zero ====
Zero (ゼロ), also known by his hero name, Drive Knight (駆動騎士/ドライブナイト, Kudō Kishi/Doraibunaito), at rank 9, is a black-uniformed cyborg with a white mask face and a single eye.^{Ch. 30} He is shrouded in mystery since Genos asserted that nobody knows his true origins nor goals. In the battle with the Dark Matter Thieves, he warns Genos to watch out for Metal Knight Bofoi as a possible enemy. Drive Knight uses a special box as his weapon, which he can reshape into "Tactical Transformations", each transformation has a powerful weapon to deal with a certain type of situation.^{Ch. 35}

Drive Knight is voiced by Yōji Ueda in the original Japanese version and by Todd Haberkorn in the English dub.

==== Pig God ====
Pig God (豚神, Buta Gami/Buta-shin), ranked 10, is an extremely fat hero typically seen eating,^{Ch. 30} dressed with a dark sweater and light pants.^{Ch. 30}

He is shown to have superhuman durability due to his many layers of fat, as well as either a strong resistance or complete immunity to various poisons. Additionally, he can open his mouth to a ridiculous degree, often swallowing large enemies whole.^{Ch. 67}

Pig God is voiced by Daisuke Namikawa in the original Japanese version and by Marc Diraison and later Brook Chalmers in the English dub.

==== Superalloy Blackluster ====
Superalloy Blackluster (超合金クロビカリ/超合金ブラックラスター, Chōgōkin Kuro-bikari/Chōgōkin Burakkurasutā), ranked 11, is a dark-skinned bodybuilder superhero.^{Ch. 30} Later, it is revealed that he is not actually dark-skinned, but light-skinned and tanned.^{Ch. 129}

Not only displaying great physical strength, but Superalloy Blackluster is also the most durable superhero in S-Class. When other heroes of higher levels are shown to be wounded, Superalloy's skin is nearly indestructible except against powerful attacks like Fuhrer Ugly's acids. According to him, this is a result of intense bodybuilding making his muscles stronger than steel.^{Ch. 67} Following his recent PTSD from in his last war with fellow heroes against Monster Association, Blackluster retires and becomes Neo Heroes' combat instructor.

Superalloy Blackluster is voiced by Satoshi Hino in the original Japanese version and by Zeno Robinson in the English dub.

Note: According to a Comicbook.com article, his anime character design in season 2 was criticized for being a racist caricature by viewers outside of Japan.

==== Watchdog Man ====
Watchdog Man (番犬マン, Banken Man), at Rank 12, is a highly efficient and stoic hero in a dog costume who is charged with dealing with mysterious beings' activities at his hideout at watchdog plaza in Q-City.^{Ch. 20} He has a reputation of eliminating every last monster.^{Ch. 20} He makes his appearance at the S-Class meeting, displaying his dog-like diligence.^{Ch. 30} Watchdog Man has shown to be incredibly strong and an expert in dealing with monsters, despite his size and look. He often waits around like the Hachiko statue and sits atop a stone pedestal waiting for a monster to come at him. Garo finds Watchdog Man difficult to assess as he is more of an animal than a human in his fighting style.^{Ch. 67, 77}

Watchdog Man is voiced by Yūji Ueda in the original Japanese version and by Arnie Pantoja in the English dub.

==== Flashy Flash ====
Flashy Flash (閃光のフラッシュ/派手なフラッシュ, Senkō no Furasshu/Hadena Furasshu), ranked 13,^{Ch. 30} is a feminine-looking, high-velocity ninja hero. His two hair ornaments and a symbol on his cloak look like number signs. Flashy Flash moves at extreme speeds, accurately using his sword on many distant targets at once.^{Ch. 68} In addition to his sword skill, Flashy Flash is also a strong hand-to-hand combatant. His abilities stem from his extensive training in the Ninja Village head by Blast's former partner Empty Void. Eventually, it is revealed that he caused an incident at the Ninja Village that made him the strongest ninja the village had ever produced and Flash is also grateful to Blast for a direct help. Although he also considers Sonic a friend and rival, the main reason he saved him from being massacred during the village's incident was for not being loyal to Empty Void as well, despite their differences. Flash also had twice run-ins with the monsterfication cubes during an infiltration with Sonic at Black Void's resting place where a cube was contained in their childhood life, then eventually becomes involved with destroying them after his second encounter with another cube at a same time first meeting Blast in person while with Saitama during an assault at Monster Association's base.^{Ch. 241}

Flashy Flash is voiced by Kōsuke Toriumi in the original Japanese version and by Lex Lang in the English dub.

==== Tank-Top Master ====
Tank-Top Master (タンクトップマスター, Tankutoppu Masutā) ranked 14,^{Ch. 30}, is an athletic, tank top-clad superhero who leads an army of his brothers who also wear tank tops. Unlike his brothers who are prone to arrogance and recklessness, he is level-headed, modest, and has a strong sense of justice.^{Ch. 47} Tank-Top Master is shown to have extreme strength, being able to throw gigantic slabs of concrete at an alien ship to cause substantial damage. He developed his own form of fighting, centered on his immense physical strength.

Tank-Top Master is voiced by Katsuyuki Konishi in the original Japanese version and by Patrick Seitz in the English dub.

==== Metal Bat ====
Bad (バッド, Baddo)^{30/12/15}, also known by his hero name, Metal Bat (金属バット, Kinzoku Batto), ranked 15,^{Ch. 30} is a superhero sporting an indestructible metal bat and street fighting skills.^{Ch. 30, 33} He is assigned to be the bodyguard of a Hero Association patron Narinki and his son. In addition to his equipment, he is shown to utilize superhuman physical strength and exudes a "fighting spirit" that lets him grow stronger as he sustains heavy injuries. Metal Bat has a large soft spot for his little sister Zenko.^{Ch. 52-56} Other than his love for his sister, he is also very sympathetic like Saitama, having disagreed with other heroes about killing the opponent who is already weakened like Garo.^{Ch. 241} It is revealed that he is tasked to accompany the Hero Association's agents to go undecover at Neo Heroes, where Darkshine retired as an instructor, until they finally find out its illegal activities.

Metal Bat is voiced by Wataru Hatano in the original Japanese version and by Sam Riegel in the English dub.

==== Puri-Puri Prisoner ====
Puri-Puri Prisoner (ぷりぷりプリズナー, Puripuri Purizunā) is an openly gay superhero who prides himself in having a 10,000-year sentence for "getting grabby with men". He is usually dressed up in a prisoner's uniform with a very useless ball and chain dragging behind him, and occasionally uses break outs to capture criminals that he fancies, or if there are some men that he likes that are in trouble.^{Vol. 4 bonus} He was at rank 16, but fell to 17 after Genos advanced.^{Ch. 25} He powers up in a transformation called "Angel Style" which shows off his musculature, tearing his clothes apart, leaving him completely nude.^{Ch. 25} He is shown to have great potential, learning ways to overcome opponents even in the midst of battle. He is a down to earth person, telling Saitama about the late-fortune teller and criticizing Amai Mask's treatment of the heroes' hardships.

Puri-Puri Prisoner is voiced by Masaya Onosaka in the original Japanese version and by Ray Chase in the English dub.^{Ep. 8 credits}

=== A-Class Heroes ===
A-Class is the second strongest class of the Hero Association. Among the known A-Class heroes are:

==== Beaut ====
Beaut (ビュート, Byūtī), also known by his hero name Handsome Kamen Amai Mask (イケメン仮面アマイマスク/アマイマスク, Ikemen Kamen Amai Masuku/Amaimasuku; Handsomely Masked Sweet Mask) and formerly known as Secret Mask (シークレット仮面/秘密のマスク, Shīkuretto Kamen/Himitsu no masuku) is a monster hero with both shape shifting, hardening and regenerative abilities, most specifically making his face to be as thick as harder materials that can be broken without bleeding. He first appeared as his Sweet Mask form where he is a model, singer, and actor, having becoming a top superhero by popularity for over 28 weeks. He acquired his power during his last day as a costumed Secret Mask. However, as his power starting to consumed by his power, Beaut becomes very narcissistic, having a philosophy that heroes should be "tough, strong, and beautiful as well as be able to promptly and splendidly eradicate evil". This result him to end up choosing to remain at A-Class, rank 1, to prevent other A-Class members from applying to be S-Class without his blessing as mentioned by Hellish Blizzard when she mentions how Atomic Samurai's disciples can't join their master in S-Class.^{Web ch. 28,}^{Ch. 25} He is also part of the promotion process for any rank 1 heroes who want to advance to the next class, although he mostly cares about those entering A-class or above.^{Ch. 29}

Despite his charismatic exterior, he has a strong hatred for anything deemed evil (including those whom he consider its accomplice), and is rather merciless, executing Boros's captured subordinates on the crash-landed alien ship, even planning to kill the brainwashed victims, leading to Atomic Samurai's disciple to become suspicious of Beaut's dark secrets.^{Ch. 37, 103}.

Until when his eye stabbed on one of the Monster Association members, Beaut realize that his secret will become public at some point, and decide to find Saitama before it happen.^{Ch. 103}

At one point in his life, Amai Mask was saved by Blast as Amai Mask considered him his idol.^{Ch. 135}

Following a conversation with Saitama prior to the emergence of the Neo Heroes, Beaut comes to terms with his true form and abilities. He restarts his hero career and allows the heroes he had previously disparaged to air their grievances against him. Several heroes, including Tanktop Master and Metal Bat, forgive him after learning about his struggles with his monstrous nature and recognizing his continued commitment to heroism.

Amai Mask is voiced by Mamoru Miyano in the original Japanese version and by Ben Lepley in the English dub.

==== Snakebite Snek ====
Snakebite Snek (蛇咬拳のスネック/スネークバイト・スネック/ヘビに噛まれた首/蛇に噛まれた首, Jakōken no Sunekku/Sunēkubaito Sunekku/Hebi ni Kama Reta Kubi), introduced as at the bottom of A-Class, Rank 38, wears a smoking jacket whose texture resembles the python's skin and uses a hand-to-hand snake-styled fighting style.^{Ch. 16} He facilitates the seminar welcoming Saitama and Genos to the Hero Association and becomes irritated when they don't pay attention. He tries to fight Saitama afterwards and is easily defeated.^{Web ch. 16,}^{Ch. 16} In the J-City shelter, he and some other minor heroes are quickly defeated by the Deep Sea King. This, however, distracted the Deep Sea King until Genos arrived.^{Ch. 25-26} He has participated in multiple martial arts tournaments, including the one that Saitama had entered.^{Vol. 11-12}

Snakebite Snek is voiced by Shin-ichiro Miki in the original Japanese version and by Kirk Thornton in the English dub.

==== Golden Ball and Spring Mustachio ====
A pair of A-Class heroes. Golden Ball (黄金ボール/ゴールデンボール, Ōgon Bōru/Gōrudenbōru), introduced as rank 29, wears a skullcap and a letter jacket with his name on the front and the back. He often has a lollipop in his mouth. His weapon of choice is a slingshot, which he uses to fire golden balls made of a special metal that morph into bullets of various caliber and designs. Spring Mustachio (春の口ひげ/バネヒゲ, Haru no kuchihige/Bane Hige), introduced at rank 33, wears a tuxedo and has a black mustache that he likes to stroke. He uses a rapier called Tomboy that can coil like a spring and that can extend several street blocks. He and Golden Ball cooperate on missions.^{Ch. 20} They later face Garo, but are defeated.^{Vol. 10} In the anime, Golden Ball's slingshot has a laser sight.^{Ep. 6}

Golden Ball is voiced by Sota Arai in the original Japanese version and by Kaiji Tang in the English dub.^{Ep. 6}

Spring Mustachio is voiced by Makoto Yasumura in the original Japanese version and by David W. Collins in the English dub.

==== Lightning Max ====
Lightning Max (イナズマックス/ライトニングマックス, Inazumakkusu/Raitoningumakkusu), or simply known by his real name, Max (マックス, Makkusu) is a young prodigious karateka who wears a sports outfit and high-tech running shoes, has his hair slicked back to a point, and has a lightning symbol on his left cheek. He is ranked 20 in A-Class. He was called to Z-City to look for the rumored monster in Z-City after the creature had defeated Golden Ball and Spring Mustachio, but he came to the scene after it was already beaten by Saitama.^{Ch. 19} He is among the superheroes that were defeated by the Sea King.^{Ch. 24} In the Dark Matter Invasion storyline, he and Stinger assist Mumen Rider in a rescue operation.^{Ep. 11} In the anime, he and Smile Man were sent to A-City at the start of the series to stop Vaccine Man, but are defeated.^{Ep. 1} He later participates in the martial arts tournament but is eliminated by Suiryu.^{Vol. 11-13}

Lightning Max is voiced by Sōichirō Hoshi in the original Japanese version and by Ben Pronsky in the English dub.^{Ep. 8 credits}

==== Stinger ====
Stinger (スティンガー, Sutingā) is a popular fighter introduced as A-Class, Rank 11.^{Ch. 23} He wears a tight black suit made of bandages. Stinger wields a spear called Bamboo Shoot. In the battle against the Clan of the Seafolk, he takes down many Clan members until the Sea King shows up and defeats him.^{Web ch. 24-25,}^{Ch. 23-24} In the Dark Matter invasion storyline, he and Lightning Max assist Mumen Rider in rescue operations.^{Ep. 11} Also, he fights Grizz-Meow in the "Lost Cat" side story.^{Vol. 8 bonus} In the side story "Numbers" and in a later chapter, he is listed as rank 10.^{Vol. 10 bonus, Ch. 81}

Stinger is voiced by Tomokazu Seki in the original Japanese version and by Chris Hackney in the English dub.^{Ep. 11}

==== Atomic Samurai's disciples ====
Atomic Samurai has three A-Class disciples. According to Hellish Blizzard, they would've joined their master were it not for Amai Mask:

- Iaian (イアイアン; anime: Ia-Iron), Rank 2, is a disciple who wears an iron helmet and wields a long sword so that he resembles a medieval knight.^{Ch. 32} He accompanied Atomic Samurai to the S-Class meeting in City A, and was caught by the destruction of the city during the Dark Matter Thieves' invasion. During the fight, he loses his helmet and then his left arm to Melzargard.^{Ch. 32} Ever since witnessing Amai Mask executed the surviving Dark Matter Thieves in front of Iaian and the rest of the volunteered heroes, Iaian is the first person who confirms his suspicion of Amai Mask's true nature, and currently plan a secret investigation about the #1 A-rank hero's actual background with his fellow swordsmen once the raid on Monster Association is over.^{Ch. 103} Iaian is voiced by Yoshimasa Hosoya in the original Japanese version and by Xander Mobus in the English dub.^{Ep. 10}
- Okama Itachi (オカマイタチ, Okamaitachi), at rank 3, is the second of the Atomic Samurai's three disciples.^{Ch. 45} He cross-dresses as a woman and uses a technique with his katana to create huge blades of wind by slashing the air. During the attack at the Monster Association, he was one of the selected heroes sent to attack the enemy headquarters.^{Ch. 96} Initially found Amai Mask attractive, but eventually hates him and grows tired of his ruthless treatments towards other hardworking heroes as Okama Itachi and the rest.^{Ch. 103} He fought together with Iaian and Bushi Drill against Malong Hair, killing him after a harsh battle.^{Vol. 23}
- Bushi Drill (ブシドリル, Bushidoriru), at rank 4, dresses like a Japanese samurai from the Edo Period and is the third of Atomic Samurai's disciples.^{Ch. 45} His main weapon seems to be some sort of a great drill. During the attack at the Monster Association, he was one of the selected heroes sent to attack the enemy headquarters;^{Ch. 96} he fought together with Okama Itachi and Iaian against Malong Hair, killing him after a harsh battle.^{Vol. 23} While escaping from a sentient man-eating water monster, Bushi Drill was saved by a captain of the private mercenary squad whom the disciples rescued from Amai Mask' attempt murder.^{Ch. 113}

==== Other A-Class Heroes ====
The following are other known A-Class Heroes:

- Heavy Tank Loincloth (重戦車フンドシ, Jūsensha Fundoshi), rank 5, is a massive hero wearing only a light-colored fundoshi who was called to protect Sitch in a meeting with the criminals.^{Ch. 40-41} He is brutally beaten down by Garo when the latter began his hero hunt. Heavy Tank Loincloth is voiced by Kōichi Sōma in the original Japanese version and by Paul St. Peter in the English dub.^{Ep. 12}
- Blue Fire (ブルーファイア, Burū Faia), rank 6, wears a kung fu gi and wields small flamethrowers underneath the sleeves of his coat that he uses to burn his foes. He serves as a bodyguard to Sitch during the meeting with the criminals, but loses his hand to Garo.^{Ch. 40-41} Blue Fire is voiced by Yoshiaki Hasegawa in the original Japanese version and by Kyle McCarly in the English dub.^{Ep. 6}
- Magicman (テジナーマン, Tejinā Man; lit. Magic Trick Man), rank 7, is dressed like a magician with a top hat with a question mark on it. He can perform magic tricks that consist of sharp poker cards, a rainbow smokescreen, and breathe a special fluid in front of his opponents. In addition, Magicman owns a flock of white crows that will attack his opponents. Magicman serves as a bodyguard to Sitch during the meeting with the criminals where he was defeated by Garo.^{Ch. 40-41} Magicman is voiced by Yūya Murakami in the original Japanese version and by Robbie Daymond in the English dub.^{Ep. 12}
- Smileman (笑顔の男/スマイルマン, Egao no Otoko/Sumairu Man), rank 27, wears a costume with a smiling face on it. A large kendama is his main weapon.^{Ch. 60} In the anime, he and Lightning Max were sent to A-City at the start of the series to stop Vaccine Man, but are battered and beaten by the monster with ease.^{Ep. 1} He makes other occasional supporting appearances.^{Ch. 60, 68, 81} In the bonus manga "Threat Level", it is revealed he has two brothers: Angry Man and Crying Man.^{Vol. 15 bonus} Smileman is voiced by Takahiro Yamaguchi in the original Japanese version and by Christian La Monte in the English dub.^{Ep. 1}
- Narcisstoic (ナルシスト, Narushisuto; Lit. Narcissist), rank 29, is a flamboyant hero with super-strength, enhanced durability, and is an expert at hand-to-hand combat.^{Ch. 68} Narcisstoic is voiced by Patrick Seitz in the English dub.^{Ep. 19}
- Lightning Genji (雷源寺/雷源氏/電光ゲンジ, Kaminari-gen Tera/Kaminari Genji/Raikō Genji), rank 17, is a roller skate-clad superhero who fights using two stun batons. He was sent alone to D-City to investigate the monsters there.^{Ch. 20} Also, he fights Grizz-Meow in the "Lost Cat" side story.^{Vol. 8 bonus} Lightning Geni also fought against the outbreak of monsters in City D where his abilities couldn't work on electrical monsters Maiko Plasma and Electric Catfish Man.^{Ch. 59} Lightning Genji is voiced by Gen Satō in the original Japanese version and by Todd Haberkorn in the English dub.^{Ep. 17}
- Heavy Kong (ヘビィコング, Hebī Kongu), rank 34, is a tall, bald-headed, bearded, and muscular man wearing a cloth that is draped over half his torso and wearing a belt buckle with the word Kong on it. He watches over W-City.^{Ch. 20} He fought with other A-Class heroes against Grizz-Meow, but was defeated.^{Vol. 8 bonus} He is also attacked by Martial Gorilla.^{Ch. 59} Heavy Kong is voiced by Chris Tergliafera in the English dub.^{Ep. 17}
- Peach Terry (桃テリー/ピーチテリー, Momo Terī/Pīchiterī), rank 30, wears a samurai vest and headband with a peach on it. He and Heavy Kong fought Grizz-Meow, but were defeated.^{Vol. 8 bonus} He also appears against the Monster Association.^{Ch. 68} Peach Terry is voiced by Sam Riegel in the English dub.^{Ep. 19}
- Chain Toad (鎖ガマ/チェーンヒキガエル, Kusarigama/Chēnhikigaeru), rank 36,^{Ch. 68} is a skilled martial artist who wears a judo suit with a frog mask on the head because he was unremarkable otherwise. The mask has made him more popular with kids. He uses a kusarigama to fight. He is seen in the battles against the Monster Association,^{Ch. 68, 81} and appears in several side stories including trying to help a police station defend itself from monsters in "Pork Cutlet Bowl", and entering a hero costume contest in "Taste". Chain Toad is voiced by Koichi Soma in the original Japanese version and by Robbie Daymond in the English dub.^{Ep. 19}
- Death Gatling (デスガトリング, Desugatoringu), rank 8, has an automatic gun for his left arm.^{Ch. 81} Death Gatling is voiced by Kento Shirashi in the Japanese version and by Jarred Kjack in the English dub.^{Ep. 17}
- Feather (フェザー/羽, Fezā), rank 34, is dressed in feathers and long bladed claws. He is part of Sekingal's Monster lair raid support team.^{Ch. 95}
- One Shotter (ワンショッター, Wanshottā), rank 22, is a confident, level-headed fighter, only losing his cool when his weapon malfunctions. One Shotter is one of the heroes recruited to the Monster Association raid's support team. He is one of the greatest snipers in the Hero Association, as his name implies.^{Ch. 95}
- Green (緑/青/緑色/グリーン, Midori), rank 24, is a hero who can manipulate the plants on his body.^{Ch. 95}
- Air (空気/空中/エア, Kūki), rank 35, is a boomerang-wielding hero in a grass skirt.^{Ch. 95}
- Shadow Ring (シャドウリング, Shadouringu), rank 32, is a ninja who is good at ninjitsu and has enhanced strength, durability, and reflexes.^{Ch. 95}
- Twin Tail (ツインテール, Tsuintēru)is a hero who dresses like a jester.^{Ch. 95}
- Crescent Eyebroll (三日月の眉毛/三日月眉毛, Mikadzuki no Mayuge/Mikadzuki Mayuge), rank 26, is a hero in armor that has crescent shapes on it. He is an expert swordsman who also possesses enhanced strength and durability.^{Ch. 96}
- Great Philosopher (偉大な哲学者, Idaina Tetsugakumono), rank 126, is a scholar-themed hero with super-strength and is an expert at hand-to-hand combat. In addition, the large book that he carries can also be used as a weapon.^{Vol. 7 Bonus}
- Butterfly DX (バタフライDX, Batafurai DX), rank 16, is a hero who wears butterfly wings on his back that grant him flight.^{Vol. 7 Bonus} Butterfly DX is voiced by Sōshirō Hori in the original Japanese version and by Joe Zieja in the English dub.^{Ep. 17.}
- Doll Master (ドールマスター, Dōrumasutā), rank 33, is a puppeteer-themed hero who carries around a marionette. It is said that not even the Hero Association knows which one is the puppet and which one is the puppeteer.^{Vol. 7 Bonus}
- Forte (得意/フォルテ, Forute), rank 31, is a hero who wears headphones that plays sounds enough that he is made unaware of his surroundings.^{Ch. 171}

=== B-Class Heroes ===
B-Class is the next tier of superheroes in the association. If a superhero in C-Class reaches Rank 1, they have the option to be promoted to B-Class. The B-Class superheroes who have recurred in the series are:

==== Tank-Top Blackhole ====
Tank-Top Blackhole (タンクトップブラックホール, Tankutoppu Burakku Hōru), listed as rank 81 wears a black tank top and is one of the many brothers related to Tank-Top Master. He persuades the crowd to go against Saitama for damaging the town by shattering the meteor. Tank-Top Blackhole and Tank-Top Tiger then try to fight Saitama, but are defeated.^{Web ch. 23,}^{Ch. 22} In the "Lost Cat" side story, he and Tank-Top Tiger were appointed to keep everyone out of a danger zone.^{Vol. 8 bonus} He also joined the Tank-Top Army against Garo, but is defeated.^{Ch. 47}

Tank-Top Blackhole is voiced by Atsushi Imaruoka in the original Japanese version and by Joshua Tomar in the English dub.^{Ep. 7}

==== Fubuki ====
Hellish Blizzard (地獄の吹雪/地獄のフブキ, Jigoku no Fubuki), is a woman with dark green hair in a straight bob style, and the top-ranking member of the B-Class heroes. She is in charge of a large faction (over 30 people)^{Vol. 10 bonus} within the Hero Association called the Blizzard Bunch. As an esper, she uses an "inborn psychic ability to defeat monsters". Her older sister is Tatsumaki, and Psykos used to be a classmate of hers in high school.^{Vol. 3 bonus} She is notorious for recruiting members for her group, but while she appears confident and calm on the surface, she is actually very insecure and frustrated from living in the shadow of her older sister. When she was offered a chance to enter A-Class, she refused as she would have a much harder chance to advance there, and instead recruited others in B-Class believing their collective strength would help her.^{Ch. 45} When the Monster Association launches an initial attack, she finds herself having to defend against her own Blizzard Bunch who were enslaved by a dominatrix-like monster named Do-S. She overcomes being mind-controlled and fends them off with help from Tatsumaki, causing the monster to retreat.^{Vol. 12}

During the assault on Monster Association's headquarters, Blizzard is able to defeat Do-S and broke the civilians from Do-S' influence and monsterfication with the help of Bang and Bomb.

Fubuki is voiced by Saori Hayami in the original Japanese version and by Laura Post in the English dub.

===== Blizzard Bunch =====
The Blizzard Bunch (フブキ組/ブリザードバンチ, Fubuki-gumi/Burizādobanchi) is a large faction of B-Class heroes that are led by Hellish Blizzard. Some of Fubuki's notable subordinates in the Blizzard Bunch are:

- Eyelashes (睫毛/マツゲ, Matsuge), rank 2, a hero with long eyelashes wearing a black suit, is the second-in-command of the Blizzard Bunch.^{Ch. 42} He fights with a pair of eyelash curlers, which can transform into a pair of long claws called Retina Awls. Eyelashes is voiced by Yoshiaki Hasegawa in the original Japanese version and by Sean Chiplock in the English dub.^{Ep. 6}
- Wild Monkey (/山猿/野生の猿, Yama Zaru/Yasei no Saru; lit. Mountain Ape), rank 3, is a very tall man wearing a black suit and is paired with Eyelashes as Blizzard's subordinates in the Blizzard Bunch.^{Ch. 42} True to his name, he is specialized in super-strength. Wild Monkey is voiced by Shinya Hamazoe in the original Japanese version. In the English dub, Wild Monkey is voiced by Greg Chun in season one and by Imari Williams in season two.^{Ep. 13}
- Triple-Staff Lilly (三節棍のリリー/トリプルスタッリリー, Sansetsukon no Rirī/Toripuru-Sutaffu Rirī), rank 74 in the anime, is a young woman with a flower-like hasp in her hair. She admires Blizzard.^{Vol. 10 extra} She fights with a three-section staff. She is voiced by Ari Ozawa in the original Japanese version and Erika Harlacher in the English dub

==== Other B-Class Heroes ====
The following are other known B-Class Heroes:

- Mushroom (榎茸/えのき茸/キノコ/マッシュルーム, Masshurūmu/Kinoko/Enokidake), ranked 93 in the anime, is a girl with a mushroom-styled haircut. She wears a bandit mask and mushroom-styled shoulder pads. She and fellow hero Horsebone investigated activities in H-City.^{Ch. 20}
- Jet Nice Guy (ジェット・ナイス・ガイ, Jetto Naisu Gai), ranked 50 in the anime, is a cyborg who resembles Mumen Rider, wearing boxing gloves. He and the other minor heroes fight Deep Sea King at the shelter, but are defeated.^{Ch. 25-26} He gets an upgrade and joins Sekingal's support team on the Monster lair raid.^{Ch. 96} Jet Nice Guy is voiced by Yoshiaki Hasagawa in the original Japanese version and by Arnie Pantoja in the English dub.^{Ep. 8}
- Pineapple (パイナップル, Painappuru) is a superhero that's dressed like a pineapple with slice-shaped shoulder pads. He and Mohican help escort Narinki and his son away from the monsters but run into trouble with Rhino-Wrestler.^{Ch. 55} Pineapple is voiced by Hiromichi Tezuka in the original Japanese version and by Sean Chiplock in the English dub.^{Ep. 17}
- Darkness Blade (闇の刃/ダークネスブレイド, Yami no Ha/Dākunesu Bureido), rank 50, is a young swordsman with a cross-shaped scar on his right cheek, wearing a black armor with fantasy decorations and fighting with a long sword.^{Vol. 10 bonus} During the side story "Sense", Darkness Blade participated in the Hero Costume Contest and fought a monster that crashed the contest.^{Vol. 10 bonus} He was one of the heroes that Child Emperor assessed power levels in the side story "Numbers".^{Vol. 10 bonus} Darkness Blade is voiced by Ben Lepley in the English dub.^{Ep. 17}
- Bone (骨, Hone), rank 77, is a hero fully dressed in a tight skeleton costume. He was seen in the story involving the police station^{Vol. 7 bonus} and also fighting the Monster Association when they initially attacked the city. Bone powers up by drinking so much milk to increase his bone density.^{Ch. 68}
- Captain Mizuki (ミズキ船長, Mizuki Senchō), rank 71, is a woman remaining dressing as a track-and-field athlete, including three medals, due to her former profession prior to being a hero. She first appears in the Monster Association raid story as a support member. She uses track-and-field items for weapons such as a javelin, a hammer, a relay race baton, and a pole vault pole. She can also grapple if need be. ^{Ch. 95-96} Following Darkshine's PTSD from a last war with other heroes against Monster Association causes him to retire as Neo Heroes' instructor, Mizuki becomes worried about her current situation.^{Ch. 185}
- Needlestar (ニードルスター, Nīdorusutā), rank 60, is usually seen chewing bubblegum and blowing bubbles.^{Ch. 95}
- Glasses (眼鏡, Megane), rank 21, is a bespectacled hero and former member of the Blizzard Bunch who is an expert at hand-to-hand combat. He was saved by Saitama during the latter's earlier hero carrier, and is inspired to become a hero like him. His glasses contain an emergency transmitter so that he can call for reinforcements.^{Vol. 3 bonus}. Glasses is voiced by Taito Ban in the original Japanese version. In English dub, he was voiced by Billy Kametz in season two.^{Ep. 22}
- Wild Horn (ワイルドホーン, Wairudohōn)is an armored superhero in a horned helmet who wields a pile driver called Pile Bison.^{Vol. 11 bonus} Wild Horn is voiced by Keisuke Hamaoka in the original Japanese version and by Ray Chase in the English dub.^{Ep. 22}
- Crying Man (泣く男/泣いている男, Nakuotoko/Naite iru otoko)is a hero at rank 69 and is the brother of Smile Man.^{Vol. 15 bonus}
- Mad Devil Yankee (マッドデビルヤンキー, Maddodebiruyankī), rank 4, is a hero with enhanced durability and endurance.^{Ch. 187}

=== C-Class Heroes ===
C-Class is the lowest tier of the Hero Association. C-Class heroes must regularly perform weekly heroic acts, usually those of helping civilians or fighting petty criminals. Those who are inactive for one week are removed from the Hero Registry.^{Ch. 17} Among the notable C-Class heroes are:

==== Mumen Rider ====
Satoru (サトル),^{Ch. 131}, known by his hero name Mumen Rider (無免ライダー, Mumen Raidā), (Note: The Mumen in Mumen Rider's name translates to "no driver's license".^{Vol. 2 endnotes}) initially listed as Class-C, Rank 1 is a bicycle-riding hero, a mixed martial artist and a BMX champion. He first appears against Hammerhead and the Paradisers. Although he is defeated, Mumen Rider is given credit for defeating them.^{Ch. 12, 15} He is a parody of Kamen Rider.^{Vol. 2 endnotes} Despite not being physically strong, Mumen Rider is the epitome of the indomitable human spirit, often throwing himself into dangerous situations without hesitation in order to save others, even if it means his death. He befriends Saitama during and after the battle with the Deep Sea King, and is one of the first few heroes to acknowledge the latter's true strength.^{Ch. 27-29} Unaware to both heroes, Mumen Rider and Saitama happened to attend a same middle school, where Satoru begin to act like a hero, calling himself a "Nameless Bicycle Commuter".^{Omake 200 Yen}

During the Dark Matter Thieves' invasion at A-City, Mumen Rider lead the rescue operations, accompanied by the A-rank heroes Stinger and Lightning Max.^{Ep. 11} In a battle against Garo, he stops Tank-Top Master from injuring Garo further, although that enables Garo to counterattack and defeat Tank-Top Master as well as the entire tank top gang and Rider himself, then lastly, Bang's disciple Charanko.^{Ch. 47} Mumen Rider is visited by Saitama in the hospital, where they and by extend, Tank-Top Master discuss about Garo. When one of the Monster Associations invade the hospital where Mumen Rider and the rest of injured heroes are resting, Mumen Rider volunteer himself as a bait to lure the Monster into being trapped by Tank-Top Master's sneak attack.^{Vol. 10, 13} As the news of Monster Association's HQ being exposed at Saitama's neighborhood, Mumen Rider and the rest of the injured heroes begin to rush towards the battlefield where other heroes presented and rescue the civilians, despite knowing their current injured states.^{Ch. 131}

Mumen Rider is voiced by Yuichi Nakamura in the original Japanese version and by Robbie Daymond in the English dub.

==== Tank-Top Tiger ====
Tank-Top Tiger (タンクトップタイガー, Tankutoppu Taigā), introduced as C-Class, Rank 6, wears a tank top and hair colored in a tiger animal print. He accuses Saitama of being a villain because he was rushing around town searching for bad guys for the purpose of maintaining his C-Class position. However, Tank-Top Tiger is defeated by Sonic.^{Web ch. 19,}^{Ch. 19} Tank-Top Tiger has several older tank-top wearing brothers who are in the association. After a giant meteor was destroyed by Saitama, Tank-Top Tiger and Tank-Top Blackhole confronted Saitama in front of a crowd of people. They tried to attack Saitama only to be easily defeated by him.^{Ch. 22} In the "Lost Cat" side story, he and Tank-Top Blackhole were appointed to keep everyone out of a danger zone.^{Vol. 8 bonus} Tank-Top Tiger also joined the tank top fighters against Garo, but is defeated.^{Ch. 47}

Tank-Top Tiger is voiced by Hiromu Miyazaki in the original Japanese version and by Chris Tergliafera in the English dub.

==== Other C-Class Heroes ====
The following are known C-Class Heroes:

- Dynamite Man (ダイナマイトマン, Dainamaitoman) is a dynamite-wielding hero at rank 221.^{Ch. 19} Dynamite Man is voiced by Bill Rogers in the English dub.
- Ecolo G (エコロG, Eko Ro G) is a caveman-themed hero at rank 179 who wields a stone axe.^{Ch. 19}
- D-Pad (十字キー, Jūji Kī) is a videogame-obsessed hero at rank 22.^{Vol. 5 bonus}. He once accompanied Golden Ball and Spring Mustachio to Z-City to investigate a monster sighting.^{Ch. 20} D-Pad is voiced by Hiroki Gotō in the original Japanese version and by Kyle Hebert in the English dub.
- Food Battler Futoshi (フードバトラー太, Fūdobatorā Dai) is a hero at rank 66 who can turn ingested nutrient into fat where he has enhanced agility in this form which is why he has to keep eating or else he will become too skinny enough to not be at full power.^{Ch. 20}
- Battery Man (バッテリーマン, Batterīman) is a hero at rank 85 who wears a battery pack that electrifies his blows.^{Ch. 20} Battery Man is voiced by Hiromichi Tezuka in the original Japanese version and by Doug Erholtz in the English dub.
- Armored Chief Clerk (装甲書記長, Sōkō shokichō) is a hero at rank 111.^{Ch. 20}
- Gasmask Cowboy (ガスマスク カウボーイ, Gasumasuku Kaubōi) is a cowboy-themed hero in a gas mask at rank 141 who wields a lasso and a revolver where he possesses expert marksmanship.^{Ch. 20} Gasmask Cowboy is voiced by Ryōta Yano in the original Japanese version.
- Grave Eight (墓八/グレイブエイト, Haka Hachi/Gureibueito) is a hero at rank 174 who wields a katana and a sawed-off shotgun.^{Ch. 20}
- Monocross (モノクロス, Monokurosu)is a hero at rank 203. As a side effect of growing out his hair, he lost his female fans.^{Ch. 20}
- Horse-Bone (馬の骨, Umanohone) is a hero at rank 283 who operates in H-City. It is unknown if the horse head and hooves are real or fake.^{Ch. 20}
- Funeral Suspenders (葬儀用サスペンダー, Sōgi-yō Sasupendā) is a suspenders-wearing hero at rank 40.^{Vol. 5 bonus} He is the one who warns Mumen Rider that Deep Sea King is too powerful for C-Class Heroes.^{Ch. 23} Funeral Suspenders is voiced by Shinya Hamazoe in the original Japanese version and by Lex Lang in the English dub.
- Bunbun Man (ブンブンマン, Bunbunman) is a muscular man at rank 331. He joined All Back-Man, Jet Nice Guy, and Sneck in attacking the Deep Sea King only for them to be defeated.^{Ch. 28} Bunbun Man is voiced by Zeno Robinson in the English dub.
- Angry Man (怒っている男/怒っている人, Ikatteiru Otoko/Ikatteiru Hito) is a rank 255 hero and is the brother of Smile Man and Crying Man.^{Vol. 15 bonus}
- Studless (スタッドレス, Sutaddoresu) is a hero at rank 295 who wears a blue bodysuit with car tires on him.^{Vol. 7} Studless is voiced by Bill Rogers in the English dub.
- Mohican (モヒカン人, Mohikan Hito) is a punk-themed hero of unknown rank.^{Ch. 55} Mohican is voiced by Takahiro Yamaguchi in the original Japanese version and by Andrew Russell in the English dub.
- Red Muffler (レッドマフラー, Reddomafurā) is a fast hero at rank 89 who also has powerful kicks.^{Ch. 59}
- Gearspear (ギアスピア, Giasupia) is a hero at rank 133 who wears an ESP helmet to strengthen his psychokinesis.^{Ch. 95}
- Poison (毒/有毒物質, Doku/Yūdoku Busshitsu) is a hero at rank 300 who wields poison knives.^{Ch. 95}
- Monster Roper Shell (モンスターローパーシェル, Monsutārōpāsheru) is a rope-wielding hero at rank 3 who assisted in the fight against the Monster Association.^{Ch. 96}

=== Staff members ===
The following are the known staff members of the Hero Association:

==== Agoni ====
Agoni (アゴーニ, Agōni) is the founder of the Hero Association; he appears as an old man in a business suit with an enormous cleft chin. Three years prior to the series, his grandson was attacked by Crablante but was saved by a passing stranger (actually Saitama). He creates the Hero Association and the Superhero Registry to manage the superheroes who would protect humanity against supervillains, monsters, and other threats to the world.^{Ch. 2, 15}

==== Exma ====
Exma (エクスマ, Ekusuma) is an executive of the Hero Association who is the deputy chief of the Hero Disciplinary Supervision Division.^{Ch. 20}

Exma is voiced by Risa Tsumugi in the original Japanese version. In the English dub, she is voiced by Michelle Deco in season one and by Jeannie Tirado in season two.^{Ep. 6}

==== Busho ====
Busho (ブショウ, Bushou) is a member of the Hero Association with a stubbly beard who takes his job seriously. He investigated Sataima's entry into the Hero Association.^{Ch. 26}

Busho is voiced by Shouta Yamamoto in the original Japanese version. In the English dub, he is voiced by Marc Diraison in season one and by David W. Collins in season two.^{Ep. 3}

==== Jinzuren ====
Jinzuren (ジンズレン, Jinzuren) is a bespectacled member of the Hero Association and Busho's partner.^{Ch. 26}

Jinzuren is voiced by Yōji Ueda in the original Japanese version and by Kyle Hebert in the English dub.^{Ep. 3}

==== Sitch ====
Sitch (シッチ, Shicchi) is the Disaster Prophecies Measures Committee Chairman for the Hero Association.^{Vol. 10 bonus} He is a short, middle-aged man dressed with a dark suit, grey hair and a big nose. He is first seen in the Rumored Monster arc, discussing with other Hero Association members about the investigations being perpetrated by heroes in the various cities, in order to prevent eventual monsters activity.^{Ch. 20} During the S-Class meeting, Sitch informs the S-Class members about the final prophecy of Madame Shibabawa, which predicted a disaster level "God" threat that will cause the destruction of whole humanity in the next six months.^{Ch. 31} Sitch later attempts to recruit potential superheroes from a group of criminals with Heavy Tank Loincloth, Blue Fire, and Magic Trick Man providing him protection, but runs in trouble when Garo appears and declares himself to be the top villain.^{Ch. 40}

Sitch is voiced by Nobuo Tobita in the Japanese version and by Kirk Thornton in the English dub.^{Ep. 11}

==== Narinki ====
Narinki (ナリンキ) is a Hero Association Executive and prominent sponsor, having made contributions to cover 7% of the association's expenses. He is a short man with a big nose and large lips.^{Ch. 64} He has a son named Waganma who also has his traits.^{Ch. 64} Narinki and Waganma are attacked by the Monster Association, and his son is abducted.^{Vol. 11}

Narinki is voiced by Koichi Soma in the Japanese version and by Paul St. Peter in the English dub.^{Ep. 16 credits}

==== Sekingal ====
Sekingal (セキンガル, Sekingaru) is an administrative member of the Hero Association who leads the rescue mission for Waganma.^{Ch. 86} He has a cybernetic eye that can shoot a laser beam. During the attack on the Monster lair, he reveals that he had previously failed the Hero Association exam.^{Ch. 96} After losing his left hand to G5 and rescued in time by Genos during the raid at Monster lair, Sekingal gains a cybernetic hand. At the same time, Sekingal is accompanied by Metal Bat to join Neo Heroes.^{Ch. 236}

==== Shizuka ====
Shizuka (シズカ, Shizuka) is a member of the Hero Association who works as their scout when looking for new superhero recruits.^{Ch. 184}

==== Zeimeet ====
Zaimeet (ゼイミート, Zeimīto) is an officer in the Hero Association. He tried to get two women to kiss in exchange for allowing them to meet Amai Mask before he is knocked out by Garo.^{Ch. 50}

Zeimeet is voiced by Ryou Sugisaki in the original Japanese version and by Richard Epcar in the English dub.

== Neo-Heroes ==
The Neo-Heroes (ネオヒーローズ, Neohīrōzu) are a new group of heroes founded by the grandson of late Shibabawa named Fuzzy. that have been established at the time when the Hero Association was starting to get a lot of criticism.^{Ch. 125} Though they are shown to have a dark motive in their recruitment plans, which then confirms to enslave humanity through cyberfication, by either using a fail safe on the enhanced battle suits it provided to its members including one of the heroes from Hero Association, and turn one of them into cyborgs. Although some of its members and those who are provided with the suits got out of its mind control protocol and survive from being turned into both cyborgs and mind controlled slaves, through either modify the suit, and has remaining willpower, left.^{Ch. 131}^{WC-Ch. 149-152} Unfortunately, the real Fuzzy was revealed to be abducted and hidden by the infiltrators, and eventually being impersonated by his robot doppelganger until he is rescued by McCoy, Metal Bat, Beaut and Wazygaza.^{WC-Ch.157}

== Villains ==
The Villains are classified by their bounties from C-class to S-class.

=== Doctor Genus ===
Doctor Genus (ジーナス博士, Jīnasu-hakase) is a genius scientist and child prodigy who became disillusioned with humanity for being primitive in his eyes, later establishing the House of Evolution to "bring true humanity and evolution in the world" through genetic manipulation.^{Ch. 9} When he was 70 years old, he did an unknown procedure that made himself young and then created a number of clones to serve as his assistants which each on ready to take over if Genus dies or is killed.^{Web ch. 9}

Genus is voiced by Daisuke Namikawa in the original Japanese version and by Ray Chase in the English dub.

=== Paradisers ===
The Paradisers (桃源団/楽園主義者, Tōgen-dan/Rakuen Shugi-sha), known in the original webcomic as New Metropolis Group (新都団/新メトロポリスグループ, Shinto-dan/Shin Metoroporisugurūpu), is a terrorist group proclaiming that the society is corrupt because rich people grow fat while poor people die and have to work. Most of its members were killed by Speed-o'-Sound Sonic.^{Ch. 12}

==== Hammerhead ====
Hammerhead (ハンマーヘッド, Hanmāheddo) is a leader of the Paradisers (桃源団, Tōgen-dan), known in the original webcomic as New Metropolis Group (新都団, Shinto-dan), a terrorist group proclaiming that the society is corrupt because rich people grow fat while poor people die and have to work, although his real reason to start the group is simply not wanting to work.^{Web ch. 12,}^{Ch. 12} He is seven feet tall and weighs 462 pounds, and was known to have beaten 20 men at once.^{Web ch. 12,}^{Ch. 12} Although he is stabbed in the back of his head by one of Sonic's knives, he survives because of his thick skull. He has a hardened battle suit he stole from an unspecified organization, but it is destroyed by Saitama.^{Web ch. 13-14,}^{Ch. 13-14}

After being defeated by Saitama and surviving an assassination attempt from the unknown robot organization representatives, he resolves to look for a job,^{Ch. 14} and is seen in later chapters preparing for a job interview or filling out a job application. In the webcomic, Hammerhead is seen working with Puri-Puri Prisoner.^{Ch. 20,}^{Ep. 11}

Hammerhead is voiced by Wataru Takagi in the original Japanese version and by Edward Bosco in the English dub.

=== Speed-o'-Sound Sonic ===
Speed-o'-Sound Sonic (音速のソニック, Onsoku no Sonikku) is first introduced as a ninja bodyguard for the rich man Zeniru, when he is deployed to fight the Paradisers.^{Web ch. 12-13,}^{Ch. 12} He is incredibly fast and uses ninja weapons such as kunai throwing knives and a sword.^{Web ch. 12-15,}^{Ch. 12-15} Although his first fight with Saitama results in his crotch accidentally landing on Saitama's fist, he vows to return and defeat Saitama.^{Web ch. 15,}^{Ch. 15} He declares himself Saitama's official rival and challenges him many times throughout the series, but he almost always suffers some sort of embarrassing defeat.^{Web ch. 19,}^{Ch. 19, 44}

He was imprisoned as Prisoner 4188 but escapes with Puri-Puri Prisoner.^{Vol. 4 bonus} When Sitch gathers villains to recruit for superheroes, he is one of the first to publicly decline and leave.^{Vol. 8} He is the remaining ninja from Empty Void's village Final 44. When he is recruited by Tempest Wind and Hellfire Flame to join the Monster Association, he accepts only their Monster Cells for his own personal gain, but since he had already cooked them, they were ineffective.^{Ch. 78} It is revealed that both Sonic and Flash were once childhood friends, and Flash spared him out of respect for their friendship. Sonic is also revealed to have had a brief run-in with God's "monstrification cube" during his childhood, when he and flash infiltrated Void's resting place.^{Ch. 241} After he and Flash kill all members of the Heavenly Ninja Party (the revived re-humanized Tempest Wind and Hellfire Flame included), they are each gifted by Saitama an ultimate Ninja weapon confiscated from Empty Void. Sonic and Flash end up clashing with each other over their respective points of view about Saitama, with Sonic planning to kill Flash after Saitama is dealt with. Sonic reveals that his reason to resent heroes is because of Blast massacring almost every junior who was loyal to Empty Void at the Graduation Exam, with Sonic and Flash being one of the surviving juniors.^{WC-Ch. 114 - 118}

In the anime, Sonic is voiced by Yūki Kaji in the original Japanese version and by Erik Scott Kimerer in the English dub.

=== Garou ===
Garou (ガロウ, Garō; anime: Garou) is a self-titled Hero Hunter (ヒーロー狩り, Hīrō Gari) and a former disciple, and adopted grandson of Bang before he was expelled for mercilessly beating up his fellow disciples, preferring to use his master's former fighting style, Fist of Unleashed Explosive as a last resort.^{Vol. 10} As a child, he is a social outcast as he sympathizes with monsters and sees heroes as bullies who prey on misfits.^{Ch. 41, 85} He infiltrates a martial arts tournament by posing as a competitor named Wolfman whom he subdued and wins using his identity.^{Ch. 53} In the main storyline, he first appears among an assembly of criminals whom Sitch tries to recruit to support the Hero Association. He defeats the criminals and heroes alike, and then assumes a "Hero Hunter" role, defeating a number of members of the Hero Association, although he is later unknowingly knocked out by Saitama.^{Vol. 10-11} He befriends a boy named Tareo who holds a magazine that profiles the heroes. Following his attacks on Metal Bat and Watchdog Man, the latter forcing him to retreat, Garou is injured by Saitama while attempting to attack King. After being nearly killed by Genos, Bang, and Bomb, he is taken to the Monster Association to be recruited, but refuses the offer.^{Vol. 16-17} He loses to Orochi and is enchained, until he was rescued by Puri-Puri Prisoner.^{Vol. 19} He accidentally touches God's hand and transforms into his misanthropic avatar that destroys almost all the heroes. He later realizes his mistakes and offers Saitama to copy his ability to allow the latter to travel back in time to restore his former self, the heroes, and the universe. Thanks to Saitama and Tareo, Garou reconciles with Bang and restarts his new life with him.

In the anime, Garou is voiced by Hikaru Midorikawa in the Japanese version and by Greg Chun in the English dub.

=== Empty Void's Ninja Village ===
An unnamed ninja village headed Empty Void was a village where Flashy Flash and Speed-O-Sound Sonic originally being raised at before their betrayal while Blast directly helps Flash for the massacres. In the past prior the "God"'s monsterfication cube became known to the "village", whule remained a secret facility to train ninjas, its exact environment was unknown. Until when Void became a monster, the base becomes modeled after "God"'s cube, where it was contained prior to Blast's raid nine year after Flash's betrayal. Several years in the day after Garou's redemption, the Ninja Village has reformed when Saitama returned Void's humanity:

==== Empty Void ====
Empty Void (空の虚空/虚空のヴォイド, Sora no Kokū/Kokkū no Voido): A founding grandmaster of his "village". He was once Blast's human partner from another world, as well as his brother in-law, after the latter married the former's sister, Luna, and Void becomes Blue's uncle. However, he begin to resent Blast for the death of his beloved sister, Luna. This "God" exploit his mind and manipulated him into becoming "his" brainwashed monster by the power of the entity's cube. After his monsterfication, Empty Void gains an ability to open Celestial Rock Cave portal that connects to dimension where "God" is hiding. Those who mentioning his former human name are forbidden. He was temporarily being put into coma by Blast during their last fight. Until fifteen years after the destruction of his village, and during the Hero Association's final fight against Monster Association, where Garou sends Saitama to save himself to past by shattering out of his radioactive monster form that would kill all lifes around him, the essence from Garou's temporary cosmic monster form that defies "God"'s will reawakens Void. While attempting to kill both Blast, Sonic and Flash, Void's swords are stolen by Saitama, when he unknowingly attempt to surpuse attack him, with Saitama gave for Flash and the scrolls that contains powerful techniques for both Flash and Sonic, once Blast and Void's feud is over. Thankfully, because Void still have humanity left in him, Saitama's punch averted Void's monsterfication.^{Ch. 241, 246 - 248}

==== Maya ====
Maya (マヤ) known by her ninja code name, Selenian Luna (月影のルナ, Tsukikage no Runa; Moon Shadow Luna): A late second in-command of the "village" led by her older brother, Void. Upon being tasked to keep an eye on Blast, after "God" turned one of the "village" disciples into monsters, Luna and Blast fell in love and gave a birth of a son Blue. However, Luna died when Blue was a child at some point, and Void's anger towards Blast for Maya's death made him vulnerable to "God"'s exploitation that led him to be manipulated into "his" brainwashed monster for years, until Saitama returned his humanity during the main event.

==== Heavenly Ninja Party ====
- Tempest Wind (テンペストウィンド/疾風のウィンド, Tenpesutou~indo/Shippū no Windo) and Hellfire Flame (業火の炎/業火のフレイム, Gōka no honō/Gōka no Fureimu) are a pair of ninjas from the Golden 37 group who recruit Speed-o'-Sonic to the Monster Association in order to fight the Hero Association, especially Flashy Flash.^{Ch. 78} In the Monster Association arc, they fight Flashy Flash, who eventually slew them in their dragon-level monster forms.^{Ch. 100} Later, Phoenix Man resurrects the two as zombies to assist his fight against Child Emperor in addition to a bunch of fodder monsters. Child Emperor hits the zombies with a powerful electrical shock, destroying the fodder monsters but defibrillating the two ninja warriors from their hypnosis. They then leave and briefly encounter Saitama, who finds them weird due to the shock also destroying their clothing, leaving them naked. They vow to kill Saitama after they first kill Flash, then leave. After Monster Association's downfall, Tempest and Hellfire are killed by both Flash and Sonic, despite getting helps from other surviving members of the village. Tempest Wind is voiced by Tashi Murata in the original Japanese version and by Grant George in the English dub. Hellfire Flame is voiced by Yasuaki Takumi in the original Japanese version and by Tim Friedlander in the English dub.^{Ep. 21 credit}

== Monsters ==
The Monsters (also known as Mysterious Beings) in the series are categorized by five threat levels: God (can cause human extinction), Dragon (can destroy multiple towns), Demon (can destroy a town), Tiger (can cause massive loss of life), and Wolf (generally dangerous).^{Web ch. 22,}^{Ch. 22} According to the bonus manga "Threat Level", Demon is the equivalent of an S-Class hero, Tiger is A-Class, and Wolf is B-Class.^{Vol. 15}

=== Vaccine Man ===
Vaccine Man (ワクチンマン, Wakuchin Man) appears in the start of the story, a Mysterious Being spawned from the massive pollution of the earth who considered it his mission is to eradicate the virus known as humanity. He took out two superheroes before being slain by Saitama.^{Web Ch. 1,}^{Ch. 1} The character is modeled after Piccolo from Dragon Ball

In the anime, Vaccine Man is voiced by Ryusei Nakao in the original Japanese version and by Christopher R. Sabat in the English dub.

=== Crablante ===
Crablante (カニランテ/クラブランテ, Kanirante/Kuraburante) is a mutated crab-like humanoid from the waist up. Originally a human, he transformed into Crablante because he ate too many crabs and then went on a murderous rampage to get revenge on a boy who drew nipples on his chest while he was asleep. Crablante was slain by Saitama who saved the boy.^{Web ch. 2,}^{Ch. 2} His defeat resulted in both Saitama's resolve to become a superhero and the boy's grandfather Agoni establishing the Hero Association.

In the anime, Crablante is voiced by Yukitoshi Tokumoto in the original Japanese version and by Chris Cason in the English dub.

=== Fukegao and Marugori ===
Fukegao (ふけがお/フケガオ, Fukegao/ Fuke ga o) and Marugori (マルゴリ, Marugori) are brothers who plan on conquering the world, known in the anime and the web manga as the Brain and Brawn Brothers (天才と筋肉兄弟/ブレインとブラウンの兄弟, Tensai to Kinniku Kyōdai/Burein to Buraun no Kyōdai).^{Web ch. 3}

Fukegao is a mad scientist with aspirations of world domination who creates an enlargement drink that transforms the bodybuilding Marugori, who desired to become the strongest person on the world, into a mutated 270-meter (890 ft) giant. Fukegao was accidentally crushed by Marugori who would later be slain by Saitama.^{Ch. 3}

Fukegao is voiced by Takuma Suzuki in the original Japanese version and by Kirk Thornton in the English dub.

Marugori is voiced by Shinya Hamazoe in the original Japanese version and by Bryce Papenbrook in the English dub.

=== Subterraneans ===
The Subterranean people (地底人/地下の人々, Chitei-jin/Chika no Hitobito) are a race of underground creatures that live below Z-City. While sleeping, Saitama dreamed a scenario where the Subterraneans rise up to wreak havoc and massacre 70% of the population, with the Subterranean King (地底の王, Chitei no Ō) being an especially powerful opponent. In reality, it turned out that the Subterraneans are actually very weak, and Saitama easily killed the Subterranean King when they attempted to invade. The rest of them fled back underground.^{Web ch. 4,}^{Ch. 4}

The Subterranean King was voiced by Yōji Ueda in the original Japanese version and by Kirk Thornton in the English dub.^{Ep. 1}

=== House of Evolution ===
The House of Evolution (進化の家, Shinka no Ie) is a group of mutants created to further human evolution using genetic manipulation, and take over the world. It is led by Dr. Genus.^{Ch. 9} Following their defeat by Saitama, Genus and Armored Gorilla open up a takoyaki stand. It is revealed that S-rank superhero Zombieman was one of Genus's creations.^{Ch. 89}

==== Mosquito Girl ====
Mosquito Girl (モスキート娘/モスキートガール, Mosukīto Musume/Mosukītogāru) is a voluptuous mosquito woman who can telepathically command mosquitoes within a range of 50 km to drain every living being in sight. She uses the blood acquired by the mosquitos to regenerate her limbs and become stronger. Genos had difficulty fighting her until Mosquito Girl was killed by Saitama.^{Web ch. 5-6,}^{Ch. 5-6} However, at some point ever since Saitama led House of Evolution's reform into a takoyaki stand, it is revealed that Mosquito Girl survived due to Saitama actually attacking her blood sack which is currently regenerating and helping Doctor Genus and Armored Gorilla in their new normal life. In addition, she now sports cybernetic limbs and drinks blood through a syringe while awaiting for her blood sack to finish regenerating.^{Ch. 190}

Mosquito Girl is voiced by Miyuki Sawashiro in the original Japanese version and by Cristina Valenzuela in the English dub.

==== Armored Gorilla ====
Armored Gorilla (アーマードゴリラ, Āmādo Gorira) - Estimated disaster level: "Demon" is a large cyborg gorilla. After being defeated by Genos and discovering that Beast King was killed by Saitama, Armored Gorilla surrenders and reveals information about the House of Evolution, so Genos spares his life.^{Web ch. 8} Later, he helps Dr. Genus transform the House of Evolution into a takoyaki restaurant. In the anime, he makes a short cameo together with Doctor Genus when the Dark Matter Thieves attacked A-City, watching the report on TV. During the Monster Association attacks, he encounters Martial Gorilla who accuses him of assimilating with humans. Armored Gorilla knocks out Martial Gorilla when he attacks him. Eventually, he indirectly leads Zombieman to learn how the House of Evolution had fallen and immediately reformed.^{Ch. 78}

In the anime, he is voiced by Shōta Yamamoto in the original Japanese version and by Kaiji Tang in the English dub.

==== Carnage Kabuto ====
Carnage Kabuto (阿修羅カブト, Ashura Kabuto) - Estimated disaster level: "Dragon" is an humanoid rhinoceros beetle that is the House of Evolution's ultimate creature. He is dangerously powerful and smart, easily outclassing all of the other creations of Doctor Genus. Despite his level of intelligence however, Carnage Kabuto had been deemed mentally unstable by Doctor Genus, and as such, remained chained and imprisoned within the House of Evolution's basement. Carnage Kabuto was slain by Saitama.^{Web ch. 9-11,}^{Ch. 7-10}

He was voiced by Unshou Ishizuka in the original Japanese version, and by Mike McFarland in the English dub.

==== Other House of Evolution creations ====
Other creations of the House of Evolution include:^{Web ch. 7-9,}^{Ch. 7-10}

- Manty (マンティ/カマキュリー, Manti/Kamakyurī) is an mantis who accompanied Armored Gorilla in a plot to abduct Saitama only to be killed by Saitama.^{Ch. 7} Manty was voiced by Yoshiaki Hasegawa in the original Japanese version and by Kyle Hebert in the English dub.^{Ep. 2}
- Slugerous (のろまな/ナメクジャラス, Noromana/Namekujarasu) is a small, dumpy-looking slug mutant with telepathic abilities who accompanied Armored Gorilla in a plot to abduct Saitama. He was accidentally killed by Beast King.^{Ch. 7-8} Slugerous was voiced by Shinya Hamazoe in the original Japanese version and by Chris Cason in the English dub.^{Ep. 2}
- Frog Man (カエル男, Kaeru Otoko) is a frog mutant with a scar on his face, who wears a wide belt and black pants. He accompanied Armored Gorilla in a plot to abduct Saitama.^{Ch. 7-8} He was voiced by Horoki Gotō in the original Japanese version and by Kirk Thornton in the English dub.^{Ep. 2}
- Ground Dragon (グランドドラゴン, Gurando Doragon) is a mole mutant who accompanied Armored Gorilla in a plot to abduct Saitama. After Beast King was slain, Ground Dragon tried to burrow away only for Saitama to appear underground and slay him.^{Ch. 8} He was voiced by Shinya Hamazoe in the original Japanese version and by Benjamin Diskin in the English dub.^{Ep. 2}
- Beast King (獣王/獣王, Kemono-ō/Jūō) is a large, muscular, bipedal lion mutant who wears fur suits and iron necklaces. As the second strongest creation of Dr. Genus, Beast King accompanied Armored Gorilla in a plot to abduct Saitama. After a tough battle, Beast King is slain by Saitama causing Armored Gorilla to surrender.^{Ch. 8} Beast King was voiced by Jirō Saitō in the original Japanese version and by Paul St. Peter in the English dub.^{Ep. 2}

=== The Organization ===
The Organization (組織, Soshiki) is a group of robots that cause havoc throughout the different cities.^{Ch. 14}

=== Kombu Infinity ===
Kombu Infinity (昆布インフィニティ, Kombu Infiniti) is a kombu-headed Mysterious Being who manipulates its tentacles like whips. Kombu Infinity travels to Z City, hoping to become a notorious monster and have a title like Ghost Town Monster. It easily defeats A-Class heroes Golden Ball and Spring Mustachio, but is defeated by Saitama who had randomly encountered him after a grocery shopping trip and is stripped of all its tentacles to make kombu soup causing Kombu Infinity to flee.^{Ch. 20}

Kombu is voiced by Ami Naitō in the original Japanese version and by Tara Sands in the English dub.

=== Clan of the Seafolk ===
The Clan of the Seafolk (海の民の一族/海人族, Kainotami no Ichizoku/Kaijin-zoku) were a race of humanoid marine animals that originated from the sea.

- The Deep Sea King (深海の王, Shinkai no Ō) is the self-proclaimed leader of the Clan of the Seafolk (海人族, Kaijin-zoku). He is a large, muscular piscine humanoid adorned with a crown and a royal cape. He easily defeats Stinger and Lightning Max, and is hardly bothered by Puri-Puri Prisoner. While strong on dry land, being hydrated enables the Deep Sea King to assume his true appearance and power. He can project corrosive spit and unleash a tongue that has a little mouth at its end.^{Web ch. 24-27,}^{Ch. 24-25} The Deep Sea King is voiced by Rikiya Koyama in the original Japanese version and by Keith Silverstein in the English dub.
- The Sea Folk Messenger (海の民のメッセンジャー, Kainotami no Messenjā)is a bipedal octopus-like Seafolk who appeared at J-City to warn the humans that the Seafolk are coming. Afterwards, he is slain by Saitama.
- The Urn Eel (壺うなぎ/オモウツボ, Tsubo Unagi/Omoutsubo) is an eel-like Seafolk that resides in an urn. After the Seafolk invasion was thwarted, Urn Eel went into hiding and later tried to eat the escaped prisoners from Smelly Lid Prison only to be killed by Puri-Puri Prisoner. Urn Eel is voiced by Takahiro Yamaguchi in the original Japanese version.

=== Ancient King ===
Exclusive to the anime, the (古代の王, Kodai no Ō) is the colossal leader of the Terror Lizard Clan. Awakening from his 300 million-year slumber, the Ancient King decides to take advantage of the deaths of the Subterranean King and the Deep Sea King. He does a number on the military before being killed by Tornado.

Ancient King was voiced by Hiroki Gotō in the Japanese version and by Jamieson Price in the English dub.^{Ep. 10}

=== Skyfolk ===
The Skyfolk (天上人/スカイフォーク, Tenjōjin/Sukaifōku) are a race of humanoid creatures that come from the sky and can project energy beams from their mouths.

- The Sky King (スカイキング/天空王, Sukaikingu/Tenkūō) was the Tengu-like ruler of the Skyfolk who briefly appeared atop City A to take advantage of the deaths of the Deep Sea King and the other kings to attack S-class headquarters. He and his Skyfolk subordinates were all easily killed by Melzargard when the Dark Matter Thieves began their own assault on the city.^{Ch. 32} Sky King was voiced by Christopher Corey Smith in the English dub.^{Ep. 10}
- Eagle (鷲/イーグル, Washi/Īguru)is a tan-skinned Skyfolk who is one of the subordinates of the Sky King. He accompanied Sky King in a plan to attack the S-Class headquarters only to be killed by Melzargard when the Dark Matter Thieves attack.^{Ch. 32}
- Hawk (鷹/さしば, Taka/Sashiba)is a blue-skinned Skyfolk who is one of the subordinates of the Sky King. He accompanied Sky King in a plan to attack the S-Class headquarters only to be killed by Melzargard when the Dark Matter Thieves attack.^{Ch. 32}
- Falcon (鷹/ファルコン/ハヤブサ/はやぶさ, Taka/Farukon/Hayabusa)is a turquoise-skinned Skyfolk who is one of the subordinates of the Sky King. He accompanied Sky King in a plan to attack the S-Class headquarters only to be killed by Melzargard when the Dark Matter Thieves attack.^{Ch. 32}
- Kite (凧/カイト, Tako/Kaito)is a black-skinned Skyfolk with bat-like wings who is one of the subordinates of the Sky King. He accompanied Sky King in a plan to attack the S-Class headquarters only to be killed by Melzargard when the Dark Matter Thieves attack.^{Ch. 32}

=== Dark Matter Thieves ===
The Dark Matter Thieves (ダークマター盗賊団, Dākumatā Tōzoku-dan) are a group of aliens operating as space pirates that raid planets for their resources.

They consist of:

- Boros (ボロス, Borosu) - Estimated disaster level: "Dragon+/God" is a cyclops-like alien with spiky hair whose armor limits his abilities. He is the leader of the Dark Matter Thieves and self-proclaimed subjugator of the universe.^{Ch. 32} Like Saitama, Boros suffered a self-imposed existential crisis because of his vast power and sought to find a worthy opponent who can give him a desired fight. His search led him to Earth. He went into battle against Saitama where their battle went long until Saitama managed to beat Boros. Before dying. Boros complimented Saitama for being a worthy opponent.^{Ch. 46} Boros is voiced by Toshiyuki Morikawa in the original Japanese version and by Chris Jai Alex in the English dub.
- Melzargard (メルザルガルド, Meruzarugarudo) is a shapeshifting alien with five marble-sized cores contained in each of his heads. He cuts off Iaian's left forearm before being killed in battle against Metal Bat, Puri-Puri Prisoner, Atomic Samurai, and Bang.^{Ch. 32} Melzargard was voiced by Koki Uchiyama in the original Japanese version. In the English dub, he was voiced by Vic Mignogna in the anime series and by Kellen Goff in One Punch Man: A Hero Nobody Knows.^{Ep. 10}
- Groribas (グロリバース, Guroribāsu) is a humanoid with a Venus flytrap for a head and hands. He went up against Saitama and was slain by him.^{Ch. 32} Groribas was voiced by Shinya Hamazoe in the original Japanese version and by Bill Rogers in the English dub.^{Ep. 10}
- Geryuganshoop (ゲリュガンシュプ, Geryuganshupu) is a telekinectic squid-like alien that serves as the right-hand of Boros. He was killed when Saitama threw a small stone through his head.^{Ch. 32} Geryuganshoop was voiced by Hiroki Gotō in the original Japanese version and by Brian Beacock in the English dub.^{Ep. 11}

=== Monster Association ===
The Monster Association (怪獣協会, Kaijū Kyōkai) is a group of monsters who have assembled against the Hero Association, some of its members being humans that mutated from ingesting Monster Cells (怪人細胞, Kaijin Saibō).

==== Monster King Orochi ====
Monster King Orochi ("怪人王"オロチ, "Kaijin-ō" Orochi) is the figurehead leader of the Monster Association,^{Ch. 66} formerly an antisocial human and combat genius whose Psykos mutated through a special "growth"-stimulating process to break his limit of growth.^{Ch. 89} Due to Psykos's modifications, Orochi can transform his body into more monstrous forms and can absorbs opponents to gain their energy and powers.^{Ch. 94, 97, 108} Furious over his defeat by Saitama, Orochi devoured most of the remaining monsters before converging on Psykos to absorb her. But she manages to take control over his body and uses it to fight the heroes before eventually separating from Orochi when they are overpowered by the heroes and Orochi is killed by Tornado.

Monster King Orochi is voiced by Atsushi Ono in the original Japanese version and by Jason Marnocha in the English dub.^{Ep. 18 credit}

==== Psykos ====
Psykos (サイコス, Saikosu) is an esper who is the Monster Association's true leader. She is a former high school friend of Blizzard's until the latter seals her power. She resolves to kill all humans after having a vision of humanity's future. She recruits^{Ch. 94} and experiments on Orochi, and allows him to run the Monster Association^{Ch. 89} while monitoring his alias, Gyoro-Gyoro (ギョロギョロ), a one-eyed slug-like form with multiple arms protruding from the head who uses eye creatures for observation and to remotely communicate with others.^{Ch. 79} Psykos loses her disguise and ends up being temporary fused with Orochi when he tries to devour her, eventually separating from him when the heroes overpower them while Tornado readies a finishing blow. After being defeated, Psykos is placed in a secret prison within A-City, which secretly headed by one of the members of Tsukuyomi crime syndicates. Until she is preserved safely by Fubuki and her group, with the help from Saitama, despite Tatsumaki's minor interference.^{Web ch. 109}

Gyoro-Gyoro is voiced by Takehito Koyasu in the original Japanese version and by Bill Millsap in the English dub.^{Ep. 18 credit}

==== Monster Association Executives ====
There are nine monsters that are chosen and promoted by Gyoro-Gyoro to be the Executives within the Monster Association.

- Nyan (ニャーン, Nyān) is a cat-like Mysterious Being that is one of Monster Association's executives.^{Ch. 112} During the attacks by the Monster Association, Nyan attacked Smelly Lid Prison to find Puri-Puri-Prisoner only to be unable to find him.^{Ch. 66} This caused Nyan to make a deal with the prisoners and infects them with Monster Cells.^{Ch. 74} During the Hero Association's raid on the Monster Association's headquarters, Nyan is defeated by Drive Knight.^{Ch. 118} When Genos arrived, he found a defeated Nyan still in Drive Knight's hand as Drive Knight plans to dissect him later.^{120} Nyan is voiced by Christian LaMonte in the English dub.^{Ep. 18 credits}
- Goketsu (ゴウケツ) is a four-eyed Mysterious Being who was the first Super Fight champion defeated by the monsters and then captured. Goketsu was offered monster powers to make himself stronger. The Monster Cells transform Goketsu and he becomes one of the Monster Association's executives.^{Ch. 72} He defeats Genos and then offers the monster cells to the tournament fighters.^{Ch. 72-73} Gouketsu is killed off-screen by Saitama's punch, with his head landing in front of an already badly beaten Suiryu. Gyoro-Gyoro later finds Goketsu's headless body and informs Orochi about what happened.^{Vol. 14} Goketsu is voiced by Kenji Nomura in the original Japanese version and by Kellen Goff in the English dub.^{Ep. 18 credits}
- Centichoro (ムカデ長老/センティコロ, Chōrō Mukade/Sentikoro; lit. 'Elder Centipede') is a gigantic centipede-like Mysterious Being who was once brought to the brink of death in his fight against Blast.^{Ch. 84} Having since joined the Monster Association and becoming one of its executives, Centichoro arrives following Centisenpai's defeat and fights off Metal Bat,^{Ch. 55} hurling him out of range so he has to fight Garo and then fights Metal Knight. When Rhino-Wrestler finishes the assignment that the other monsters failed at by capturing Narinki's son, Centichoro digs a tunnel for them to escape.^{Vols. 10-11} Summoned by Phoenix Man, Centichoro fights Genos, Bang, and Bomb so that Phoenix Man can safely bring Garo to Orochi. When he charges towards King, Centichoro is destroyed by Saitama who allows King to take the credit.^{84-85} Centichoro is voiced by Naoki Bandō in the original Japanese version and by Richard Epcar in the English dub.^{Ep. 16 credits}
- Black Sperm (黒人の精子/黒い精子, Kokujin no Seishi/Kuroi Seishi; lit: "Black Spermatozoon") is a diminutive humanoid Mysterious Being who is an executive in the Monster Association.^{Ch. 79} Black Sperm is voiced by Yuichiro Umehara in the original Japanese version and by Jalen K. Cassell in the English dub.^{Ep. 22 credits}
- Evil Natural Water (悪の天然水/エビル天然水, Aku no Ten'nen Mizu/Ebiru Ten'nen Mizu) is a watery Mysterious Being who is an executive in the Monster Association.^{Ch. 90} When Evil Natural Water combined with the ocean, it became Evil Ocean Water. Saitama's punch was able to defeat it and Evil Natural Water was swallowed by Pig God.
- Fuhrer Ugly/Ugly President (醜い総統/ブサイク大総統/醜い大統領, Minikui Sōtō/Busaiku Dai Sōtō/Minikui Daitōryō) is a Ugmon who is an executive in the Monster Association.^{Ch. 90} Thanks to a trick by Bang, Fuhrer Ugly was swallowed by Gums causing Fuhrer Ugly to kill Gums by breaking out of its stomach. Fuhrer Ugly was later killed by Garo.
- Gums齦/歯齦/歯茎 (/歯肉/歯茎/ハグキ/ガム, Kěn/Shigin/Haguki/Haniku/Haguki/Gamu) is a gluttonous Mysterious Being that is an executive in the Monster Association.^{Ch. 90} After being tricked by Bang, Gums ate Fuhrer Ugly who killed it by breaking out of its stomach.
- Homeless Emperor (ホームレス皇帝, Hōmuresu Kōtei) is a disheveled man who is an executive of the Monster Association and had received his energy-projection powers from "God".^{Ch. 90} He fought Zombieman before being killed by "God" who took away his powers.
- Overgrown Rover (育ちすぎたポチ/生い茂ったローバー, Sodachi Sugita Pochi/Oishigetta Rōbā) is a black six-eyed dog-like Mysterious Being who is an executive of the Monster Association.^{Ch. 90} After the Monster Association was defeated, Overgrown Rover became one of Saitama's pets.

==== Regular Monster Association members ====
These members of the Monster Association have lasted for more than one fight:

- Phoenix Man (フェニックス男/フェニックスマン, Fenikkusu Otoko/Fenikkusuman) is a phoenix-like Mysterious Being with the ability to revive himself and others, or alter his body for specialized attacks. He was formerly a costumed actor who was fired after his show was canceled, ending up in his current form as the result of continuous wearing his costume until it fused with his body.^{Vol. 21} While arrogant in his abilities, his diplomatic demeanor enables him to serve as the Monster Association's middleman. Phoenix Man first appears during the Association's kidnapping of Narinki's son.^{Vols. 10-11} Additionally, Phoenix Man also uncover the dark secrets behind the Hero businesses off screen, among of them being Bofoi's.^{Ch. 185} He later crashes Garo's fight with Genos, Bang, and Bomb, to carry off Garo while calling on Centichoro to deal with the heroes.^{ch. 84-85} He later engages Child Emperor during the Hero Association's raid, reviving Subterraneans to aid him before eventually being defeated and reduced to a chick form because of Saitama's presence where he became harmless Monster named Chick Man, while also begin to assist Child Emperor behind the scene. Following Monster Association's destruction, Phoenix Man's Chick Man reforms and does work for charity activities such as being school patroller.^{Vols. 21-22} Phoenix Man is voiced by Hiroki Maeda in the original Japanese version and by Jonah Scott in the English dub.^{Ep. 17 credits}
- Sludge Jellyfish (ヘドロクラゲ, Hedoro Kurage) is a jellyfish-like Mysterious Being who has great regenerative capacities and the ability to flow even through the smallest cracks, thanks to his insubstantial body. He made his first appearance, together with Phoenix Man and Rhino-Wrestler, when they stopped Pineapple and Mohican who were removing the unconscious Hero Association's sponsor and his son from the scene. Sludge Jellyfish later crashed the battle between Child Emperor and Evil Natural Water and is accidentally killed by the latter who absorbed his oils.^{Ch. 122} Sludge Jellyfish is voiced by Tadanori Date in the original Japanese version and by Jason Marnocha in the English dub.^{Ep. 17 credits}
- Rhino-Wrestler (サイレスラー, Sai Resurā) is an anthropomorphic Indian rhinoceros dressed like a professional wrestler and is part of the Monster Association. He asserted that he trained his body as hard as he could, holding back his blood lust to reach the objective of eradicate every existing hero. Rhino-Wrestler was able to stop Pineapple and Mohican and abduct Hero Association-sponsor Narinki's son.^{Vol. 11} He later appears at the entrance to the Monster lair to fend off Sekingal's support team of A and B-class Heroes but is easily destroyed by Atomic Samurai.^{Ch. 96-97} Rhino Wrestler is voiced by Ryou Sugisaki in the original Japanese version and by Richard Epcar in the English dub.^{Ep. 17 credits}
- Marshal Gorilla (マーシャルゴリラ, Māsharu Gorira) is an anthropomorphic gorilla dressed in a military outfit with a beret and a cigar. He fights using a military knife. During the Monster Association attacks, he defeats Heavy Kong.^{Vol. 11} Marshal later encounters Armored Gorilla and accuses him of assimilating with the humans, but is knocked out by him.^{Ch. 78} Marshal Gorilla is voiced by Sōshirō Hori in the original Japanese version and by Brock Powell in the English dub.^{Ep. 17 credits}
- Electric Catfish Man (電気ナマズ男, Denkinamazu Otoko) is an enlarged electric catfish with human arms and legs and lightning-shaped mustaches, which possesses the ability to emit electricity. When many of the members of the Monster Association appeared and simultaneously attacked various cities, Electric Catifish Man attacked D-City with Maiko Plasma and they both fought Lighting Genji, proving difficult since his electric attacks had no effect on them.^{Ch. 59} During the fight between the Hero Association and the Monster Association, Electric Catfish Man and Maiko Plasma fight against Puri-Puri-Prisoner until they are absorbed by Vacuuma who consumes them to gain their powers. After Vacuuma was slain, Electric Catfish Man was regurgitated in an unconscious state.^{105} Electric Catfish Man is voiced by Patrick Seitz in the English dub.^{Ep. 17 credits}
- Maiko Plasma (舞妓プラズマ, Maiko Purazuma) is a geisha-like Mysterious Being with eight tomoe drums on her back and possessing the ability to emit electricity. When many of the members of the Monster Association appeared and simultaneously attacked various cities, Maiko Plasma attacked D-City together with Electric Catfish Man and they both fought Lighting Genji, proving difficult since his electric attacks had no effect on them.^{Ch. 59} During the fight between the Hero Association and the Monster Association, Maiko Plasma and Electric Catfish Man fight against Puri-Puri-Prisoner until Vacuuma shows up and consumes Maiko and some other monsters to gain their powers. When Vacuuma was slain, Maiko Plasma was regurgitated in an unconscious state.^{Ch. 105} Maiko Plasma is voiced by Risa Tsumugi in the original Japanese version and by Lauren Landa in the English dub.^{Ep. 17 credits}
- Vampire (Pureblood) (バンパイア (血統書付)/ヴァンパイア(純血), Banpaia (Kettōsho-tsuki)/Vu~anpaia (junketsu)) is an ancient vampiric Mysterious Being who claims to be the only "true" monster in the Association, having been born into an elder vampire family and feeding on human blood since his childhood. He is fast enough to catch bullets while seemingly not moving. When many of the members of the Monster Association appeared and simultaneously attacked various cities, Pureblood and his comrades attacked a random city.^{Ch. 59} During the fight between the Hero Association and the Monster Association, he encountered Zombieman. After a hard battle, he was killed by Zombieman who was able to win the fight thanks to his immense regenerative capacity.^{101} Vampire (Pureblood) is voiced by Doug Erholtz in the English dub.^{Ep. 17 credits}
- Monster Princess Super S (怪人姫弩S/怪物王女スーパーS, Kaijin Hime Do S/Kaibutsu Ōjo Sūpā S) is a female dominatrix Mysterious Being of the Monster Association who uses her whip to turn her opponents into love slaves. She enslaves the Blizzard Bunch, but Fubuki herself resists.^{Vol. 11-12} After failing to control Atomic Samurai's disciples, she pretends to surrender to Amai Mask in order to poke his eyes, but after seeing that Amai Mask is not human, Amai Mask crushes her head. She survives and vows to unmask his true nature when the time comes. Unfortunately, Do-S ends up being defeated by Fubuki during their rematch.^{103} Monster Princess Super S is voiced by Natsumi Fujiwara in the original Japanese version and by Wendee Lee in the English dub.^{Ep. 17 credits}
- Centikohai (ムカデ後輩/センティコハイ, Mukade Kōhai/Sentikohai; lit. 'Junior Centipede') is a centipede-like monster who surfaces from underground to attack the Hero Association's sponsor Narinki and his son Waganma at a restaurant. Centikohai was accompanied by Venus Mantrap. He was slain by Metal Bat.^{Ch. 51-52, 55} Centikohai was voiced by Takahiro Yamaguchi in the original Japanese version and by Joshua Tomar in the English dub.^{Ep. 16 credit}
- Centisenpai (ムカデ先輩/センティセンパイ, Mukade Senpai/Sentisenpai; lit. 'Senior Centipede') is a centipede-like monster with multiple human faces who appears and takes Centikohai's place as a stronger opponent. After Centikohai and Venus Mantrap were slain, Centisenpai appeared to help in finishing the assignment of attacking Narinki and his son Waganma where his fellow monster Rafflesidon used sleeping gas on Narinki and his son. He was slain by Metal Bat.^{Ch. 54} Centisenpai was voiced by Hiromichi Tezuka in the original Japanese version and by Imari Willians in the English dub.^{Ep. 16 credit}
- G5 (Gī Go) is a battle robot created by the Organization who is a member of the Monster Association.^{CH. 87} He encounters Child Emperor and Waganma.^{Ch. 100} As G5 fights Underdog Man's Mad Dog Underdog Cerberus Mode, Child Emperor and Waganma make their escape.^{Ch. 101} After defeating Underdog Man's Mad Dog Underdog Cerberus Mode and having a brief fight with Atomic Samurai,^{Ch. 108} G5 was destroyed by Genos.^{Ch. 119}

==== Minor Monster Association members ====
These members of the Monster Association who only had fought once before they were killed.

- Venus Mantrap (ヒトトリグサ/ヴィーナスマントラップ, Hitotorigusa/Vu~īnasumantorappu; lit: "Venus Peopletrap") is a carnivorous plant monster who accompanied Centikhohai in attacking the Hero Association's sponsor Narinki and his son Waganma at a restaurant. Both were killed by Metal Bat.^{Ch. 51} Venus Mantrap is voiced by Ryou Sugisaki in the original Japanese version.^{Ep. 16}
- Rafflesidon (ラフレシドン/ラッフルシドン, Rafureshidon/Raffurushidon; lit: "Lafreshidon") is a rafflesia monster who accompanied Centisenpai in finishing the assignment of attacking the Hero Association's sponsor Narinki and his son Waganma at a restaurant where he used sleeping gas on them. Both were killed by Metal Bat.^{Ch. 55} Rafflesidon is voiced by Bill Rogers in the English dub.^{Ep. 16}
- Hundred-Eyes Octopus (百々目蛸/百目タコ, Dodome Dako/Hyakume Tako; lit: "Multi-Eyed Octopus") is a giant floating octopus monster with 100 eyes. It attacked I-City where it attacked Butterfly DX, Bone, and Death Gatling before being slain by Tatsumaki.^{Ch. 59}
- Eyesight (視力/ガンリキ, Shiryoku/Ganriki; lit: "Ganriki") is a Gorgon-like monster with paralyzing venom and can assume a more monstrous and snake-faced appearance. She attacked Y-City where she paralyzed many Heroes like Ecola G, Studless, and another Hero. Eyesight then fought Child Emperor and his Underdog Man robots before being eaten by Pig God.^{Ch. 59} Eyesight is voiced by Misako Tomioka in the original Japanese version and by Lauren Landa in the English dub.^{Ep. 17}
- Free Hugger (フリーハガー, Furīhagā) is a humanoid hedgehog monster that accompanied Monster Princess Super S in attacking an unknown city where it tried to entice the locals into hugging it.^{Ch. 59} He was later killed by Puri-Puri-Prisoner.^{Ch. 76}
- Fist Fight Djinn (拳闘魔人, Kentō Majin; lit: "Demonic Pugilist") is a four-armed boxer monster. He ambushed Smile before being slain by Bang.^{Ch. 60} Fist Fight Djinn is voiced by Jarred Kjack in the English dub.^{Ep. 17}
- Face Ripper (カオハギ/フェイスリッパー, Kaohagi/Feisurippā) is a flesh-colored humanoid monster who wields two butcher knives. He attacked C-City before being killed by Genos.^{Ch. 63} Face Ripper is voiced by Yuya Murakami in the original Japanese version and by Patrick Seitz in the English dub.^{Ep. 18}
- Awakened Cockroach (覚醒ゴキブリ/目覚めたゴキブリ, Kakusei Gokiburi/Mezameta Gokiburi; lit. 'Roach Awakening') is a humanoid cockroach-like monster.^{Ch. 63} He briefly fought Genos and used adhesives to trap Awakened Cockroach before he ripped off his legs and got away.^{Ch. 64} Awakened Cockroach was later eaten by Orochi for his failure in his fight with Genos.^{Ch. 79} Awakened Cockroach is voiced by Naoya Nosaka in the original Japanese version and by Joe Zieja in the English dub.^{Ep. 18 credits}
- Haragiri (ハラギリ, Haragiri) is a member of the Council of Swordmasters who sided with the Monster Association. Upon consuming the Monster Cells, he assumed a humanoid appearance with three eyes and vine-like hair. Haragiri tried to threaten the rest of the Council of Swordmasters to eat the Monster Cells before being slain by Atomic Samurai.^{Ch. 69} Haragiri is voiced by Ken Tanaka in the original Japanese version and by Steve Kramer in the English dub.^{Ep. 19}
- Gyoffrey (ギョフリー, Gyofurī; lit: "Gyoffery") is a humanoid fat fish monster who wields a fishing rod. He attacked Mumen Rider at a hospital before being slain by Tanktop Master.^{Ch. 70} Gyoffrey is voiced by Tarō Kiuchi in the original Japanese version and by Jason Marnocha in the English dub.^{Ep. 20}
- The Three Crows (三羽のガラス, San-ba no Karasu) are Gouketsu's disciples who ate the Monster Cells and transformed into humanoid three-legged crows. They were slain by Lightning Max, Sneck, and Suiryu.^{Ch. 71}
- Destrochloridium (デストロクロリディウム, Desutorokuroridiumu) is a parasitic monster with drills for hands who took control of a Hero Association member in order to carry a message from Gyoro Gyoro to the Hero Association and even controlled the Hero Association member into killing another member. Once the message is done, Destrochloridium abandons the Hero Association member's body and is killed by Superalloy Blackluster.^{Ch. 79} Destrochloridium is voiced by Hiromichi Tezuka in the original Japanese version and by Sean Chiplock in the English dub.^{Ep. 21}
- Bug God (蟲神, Mushigami; lit: "Insect God") is a humanoid insect with second form that has wings and extra arms. Bug God was sent by Gyoro Gyoro to follow Garo to see if he can follow his assignment. He was killed by Superalloy Blackluster.^{Ch. 87}
- Royal Ripper (キリサキング/ロイヤルリッパー, Kirisakingu/Roiyarurippā; lit: "King the Ripper") is a bandaged humanoid monster with sword blades for hands. He accompanied Bug God in his mission to follow Garo to see if he can follow his assignment. He was sliced into pieces by Garo.^{Ch. 87}
- Devil Long Hair (魔ロン毛/デビルロングヘアー, Maronke/Debiruronguheā; lit: "Malong Hair") is a human-shaped monster who can manipulate his long hair which he takes pride in.^{Ch. 90} He was defeated by Iaian, Bushidrill and Okamaitachi who butchered his hair.^{Ch. 108}
- The Great Food Tub (素晴らしいフードタブ/ダイショッカン, Subarashī Fūdotabu/Daishokkan; lit: "Big Eater") is a giant monster that resembled a pig in the webcomic and a bearded dragon in the manga. He planned to eat all the heroes before being eaten by Pig God.^{Ch. 90}
- Showerhead (シャワーヘッド, Shawā Heddo) is a humanoid monster with a showerhead for a head that shoots out different liquids that he can manipulate and has clamps for hands. He was among the monsters sent to investigate an intruder to the Monster Association's headquarters. Showerhead was vaporized by Overgrown Rover.^{Ch. 92}
- Unihorn (イッカク/ユニホーン, Ikkaku/) is a humanoid monster with one horn and eyes all over his body who can transform into a spear. He was among the monsters sent to investigate an intruder to the Monster Association's headquarters. Unihorn was killed by Overgrown Rover.^{Ch. 92}
- Super Mouse (超マウス/スーパーマウス, Chō Mausu/Sūpāmausu) is a humanoid mouse monster with regenerative abilities that he got back when he was an ordinary laboratory mouse. He was among the monsters sent to investigate an intruder to the Monster Association's headquarters. Despite his regeneration ability, Super Mouse was killed by Overgrown Rover.^{Ch. 92}
- The Evil Eggs (邪悪な卵, Jaakuna Tamago)are a monster baseball team. One member was part of the first wave of monsters that attacked the heroes and was killed by Needle Star.^{Ch. 96}Yunihōn
- Evil Eye (邪眼/ジャガン, Yokoshima Me/Jagan; lit: "Jagan") is a multi-eyed monster in a long hooded cloak that used to be a human psychic before being turned into a monster by Gyoro Gyoro's experiments. Evil Eye joined the monsters in confronting the Hero Association where he was killed by Tatsumaki.^{Ch. 96}
- Raptora (ラプトラ/ラプターズ, Raputora/Raputāzu) is a buxom reptilian humanoid. She was gassed by Child Emperor when he was saving Waganma.^{Ch. 100}
- Sword Devil Executioner (剣の悪魔の処刑人/剣鬼ブッタギリ, Ken no Akuma no Shokei Hito/Kenki Buttagiri; lit: "The Chopper-Upper") is an eight-eyed demonic swordsman. He was slain by Atomic Samurai.^{Ch. 108}
- Building Booper (ブーパーを構築する/ビルブッパ, Būpā o Kōchiku Suru/Birubuppa; lit: "Building Blaster") is a humanoid detonator. He tried to collapse a tunnel to keep Saitama, Waganma, Child Emperor, and Underdog Man to keep them from escaping only for their combined strengths to get through the rubble resulted in Building Booper's death.^{Ch. 109}
- Reptera (爬虫類/レプテラ, Hachūrui/Reputera) is a reptilian humanoid and the sister of Raptora who accompanied Electric Catfish Man and Maiko Plasma in fighting Puri-Puri-Prisoner. She was among those consumed by Vacuuma to gain their power. When Vacuuma was defeated, Reptera was regurgitated in an unconscious state.^{Ch. 110}
- Baquma (Bakuma/バキューマ, Bakyūma; lit. 'Vacuumer') is a humanoid African elephant-like monster in magician attire. He inhaled the fleeing monsters through his trunk to assimilate them where he gained a larger six-armed appearance and the ability to copy their powers. Any monsters that are fully digested and excreted causes Baquma to no longer access their powers. Once Baquma was slain by Puri-Puri-Prisoner, the monsters that Baquma assimilated were released in an unconscious state.^{Ch. 110}
- Mad Doctor Fish (マッドドクターフィッシュ, Maddo Dokutā Fisshu) are a group of monstrous バクマdoctor fish that are associated with Evil Natural Water. They were killed by oil poisoning when Sludge Jellyfish came in contact with a frozen Evil Natural Water.^{Ch. 113}
- Master Joe (マスター・ジョー, Masuta Jō) is a hooded and masked monster who is the Monster Association's treasurer who carries a lot of keys. Amidst the chaos during Atomic Samurai's fight with the monsters with him, Master Joe releases Evil Natural Water and is accidentally killed by the Mad Doctor Fish.^{Ch. 113}
- Manako (マナコ, Manako; lit: "Oculette") is a small one-eyed spawn of Gyoro Gyoro.^{Ch. 122}

=== Centisennin ===
Centisennin (ムカデ仙人/センティセンニン, Mukade Sen'nin/Sentisen'nin; lit. 'Sage Centipede') is a centipede monster larger than Elder Centipede who is so large that he can reach into outer space. He targeted Saitama only for him to be slain by Garo.^{Ch. 156}

=== God ===
God is a enigmatic creature of unknown power and unclear origins, it is possibly indirectly Saitama's archenemy making him the main antagonist of the series. It seeks to wipe out the human race, believing them to be a plague to Earth. It has also clashed with Blast in the past. When a human who abandoned their humanity touched its body, this Mysterious Being is capable of granting massive power increases to beings such as Homeless Emperor, Orochi, and Psykos in exchange for loyalty to it, whom all, in turn, consider this being as a God. With no real concrete form, it generally appears in a faceless gigantic humanoid form with wrinkled skin, though when making offers of power, it can appear as someone important to the person offered power, though that form also has no face. Despite some human villains wanting to be monsters of their own rights after refusing God's offer, accidentally touching its body parts would still transform them into monstrous states by force as with Garo.^{Ch. 180}

=== Forest King ===
The Forest King (森の王様/森林王, Mori no Ō-sama/Shinrin-ō) is the tree-like leader of the Forest Tribe. He consipired to have the Forest Tribe return the lost greenery to Earth before they were all annihilated by Genos.^{Ch. 185}

== Other characters ==
=== Kuseno ===
Dr. Kuseno (クセーノ博士, Kusēno-hakase) is a scientist who transformed Genos into a cyborg.^{Ch. 7} In the anime he appears as a strange old man in a lab coat, with grey hair styled in the shape of a mushroom cap.^{Ch. 39}^{Ep. 4} Though he supports Genos in the latter's quest to avenge his family and hometown, he also implies that he wishes for Genos to give up on revenge and work to protect people instead, although Kuseno himself admits that he has never forgiven Bofoi and Mad Cyborg for what they did to his family as well.^{Ch. 39} Ever since Saitama came to Genos' life and both became full-fledge heroes, Kuseno entrusted the former to look after the latter in his stead, should anything happen to the doctor. During Neo Heroes era, where Kuseno requires Saitama to research on the bald heroes's true potential for a while, he is killed by a group of cyborg assassins, presumably sent by either Mad Cyborg or Bofoi. As the robot invasion begins, a dying Kuseno leaves a final upgrade for Genos, and made a final request to end the terrors of both Mad Cyborg and Bofoi once and for all.^{Wc-Ch. 140 - 141} Ultimately, he not only once a former colleague of Bofoi, he also stole all of his research to eradicate humanity and a true identity of Mad Cyborg. Having murdered Genos' family and using him as a test subject, turning Bofoi's prototype creation, Zero into his servant, and disguise his robot doppelgänger under his former human self's human skin after Blast injured him in the past. Currently, he kidnapped the real Fuzzy and create a front organization Neo Heroes before revealing his true color, with Genos finally learn the truth from Bofoi when he saw Zero is fighting Saitama.

In the anime, Kuseno is voiced by Kenichi Ogata in the original Japanese version^{Ep. 4} and by Doug Stone in English.

=== Zeniru ===
Zeniru (ゼニール, Zenīru) is a slightly rotund middle-aged multi-millionaire established in F-City, with a strange short curly type of hair. He wears an open bath robe, which reveals a hairy chest and a chain necklace. He hires Sonic as his bodyguard to take out the Paradisers, and allows Sonic to kill them.^{Ch. 12}

He is voiced by Hiroki Gotō in the original Japanese version and by Kirk Thornton in the English dub.^{Ep. 4 credits}

=== Shibabawa ===
Shibabawa (シババワ) is an old decrepit lady renowned for being a great fortune teller who resided in G-City, which appeared on television on a few occasions. Even though she only predicted a fraction of disasters and there were many that she could not foresee, her predictions were 100% accurate. Therefore, she received special treatment from the Hero Association itself, such as personal escorts. Shibabawa later died from a coughing fit that led to her choking on her cough drops after making a prediction about a God-level threat that would come in the next six months.^{Ch. 28, 31}

She is voiced by Kimiko Saitō in the original Japanese version and by Barbara Goodson in the English dub.^{Ep. 8 credits}

=== Charanko ===
Charanko (チャランコ) is the sole martial artist at Bang's dojo.^{Ch. 30} He joined and trained in martial arts in order to become popular but did not amount to much and was given most of the menial tasks such as wiping the floors. He worked for a year until Bang's other disciples quit, making him the "number-one disciple".^{Vol. 7 bonus} He tries to fight Garo but is defeated and hospitalized.^{Ch 47} He then gives his contestant ticket for the martial arts tournament to Saitama, who impersonates him.^{Ch. 49}

He is voiced by Toshiki Masuda in the original Japanese version and by Todd Haberkorn in the English dub.

=== Bomb ===
Bomb (剽/爆弾/ボンブ/ボム, Bakudan/Bonbu/Bomu/Piāo) is Bang's older brother and a powerful martial arts master. His speciality is the "Fist of Whirling Wind, Slashing Steel" (旋風の拳斬鋼, Senpū no Ken Zankō). Bomb is also the main reason behind Bang's redemption during their last younger days, leading his younger brother to renew his fighting style as it is today and open his dojo before being recruited to Hero Association in the present, sometimes before Saitama join the said hero organization. When Garo's "hero hunting" first occur, Bomb originally offers Bang his assistant, but Bang decline because Garo's downfall into walking a similar path as the latter's younger-self was his responsibility.^{Ch. 150} When Garo's "hero hunting" became worse, Bang had no other options to come to his dojo to accept his big brother's offer and to stop his former disciple, and Bomb agrees, finding Garo as a possible future threat for his own dojo as well.^{Ch. 46}

He is voiced by Shinya Fukumatsu in the original Japanese version and by Brook Chalmers in the English dub.

=== Sourface ===
Sourface (表面/ニガムシ, Hyōmen/Nigamushi) is a rather large muscular man with a huge and hostile face which is a professional martial artist always dressed with a white gi. Sourface was once a disciple of Bang, but left after Garo rampaged through the dojo; sometime afterwards, he created the Sourface-style Kempo martial arts and started his own dojo. He meets Saitama at the martial arts tournament thinking that he is talking to Charanko.^{Ch. 53} Following Garo's redemption thanks to Saitama, Sourface returns to be Bang's disciple once again.^{Ch. 236}

He is voiced by Itaru Yamamoto in the original Japanese version and by Armen Taylor in the English dub.

=== Waganma ===
Waganma (ワガンマ) is the son of Hero Association staffer Narinki.^{Ch. 64} He is abducted by the Monster Association.^{Vol. 11} He meets Tareo briefly when the latter is captured. When Child Emperor rescues him, he remarks how cool Child Emperor's items are.^{Vol. 21-22}

Waganma is voiced by Ayaka Shimizu in the original Japanese version and by Morgan Berry in the English dub.^{Ep. 16 credits}

=== Suiryu ===
Suiryu (スイリュー, Suiryū) is a young man with tan skin and a low ponytail, he wears a traditional black uniform used in Chinese martial arts with star-like buttons. He had won four consecutive Super Fight tournaments before, as he is an incredibly powerful martial artist, utilizing the Void Fist style. He is very popular and has lots of female admirers, but does not want to be a hero, preferring to be a free spirit. He advances to the finals in the tournament that Saitama entered, but is unable to beat Saitama. However, he wins when Saitama is disqualified officially, yet still unsatisfied because of his recent encounter with Saitama. Shortly afterwards when the Monster Association converts many of martial artists with deeper darker sides into monsters, just as Suiryu's losing his strength and unable to fight the last of them (namely Goketsu and a recently monsterized Bakuzan), he cries for help and Saitama rescues him after which he vows to become a hero.^{Vol. 11-14} When the news of Monster Association's HQ has been exposed to the surface at a location where Saitama lives, just as the rest of the heroes who were injured from the previous battle rushes toward the battlefield and rescue civilians, Suiryu is aware of his fellow surviving martial artists wanted to aid the heroes, but sadly their mental states are still traumatized, advising them to train both physics and mentalities first as the means to be real heroes.^{Ch. 131} After the fall of Monster Association, just as the Hero Association is on the brink of critical situation by some heroes' current awful statuses, Suiryu is ready to join a superhero society, where he initially planned join the Hero Association, before deciding to switch to join Neo Heroes, whereas his sister, Suiko is the one who joins Hero Association to honor their late-grandfather, Suicho. Until when Neo Heroes revealed its true villainous color into brainwashing one of its members through battle suits given to them, Suiryu was temporarily brainwashed by the suit, until a modified suit empowered Mumen Rider freed him.^{Web ch. 125, 153 - 154}

Suiryu is voiced by Masaya Matsukaze in the original Japanese version and by Alan Lee in the English dub.

=== Suiko ===
Suiko (スイコ) is a girl with tan skin and short black hair, a younger sister of Suiryu who trained in the same fighting style as their grandfather, Suicho. She visited her brother at the hospital, sometimes after the latter was rescued by Saitama, while watching the Monster Association's headquarters being discovered by Heroes Association's Tatsumaki to the world.^{Ch. 185} After Monster Association's downfall, Suiko joins the Hero Association, while Suiryu joins Neo Heroes to honor her late grandfather.^{Web ch. 125}

=== Zenko ===
Zenko (ゼンコ) is Bad's younger sister who is often trying to appeal to or spoil her.^{Ch. 52-56} However, she often scolds him for his behavior, displaying a greater level of maturity despite their age difference.

Zenk is voiced by Ayumi Mano in the original Japanese version and by Jackie Lastra in the English dub.

=== Tareo ===
Tareo (タレオ)is a boy who has a guidebook to the Heroes. He is a loner whose classmates tend to bully or take advantage of. Garo befriends him.^{Vol. 15}

He is voiced by Natsumi Fujiwara in the original Japanese version and by Jeannie Tirado in the English dub.

== Works cited ==
- "Ch." and "Vol." are shortened forms for chapter and volume in the One-Punch Man manga
- "Web ch." is shortened form for web chapter and refers to the online web chapter of One-Punch Man
- "Ep." is shortened form for an episode and refers to an episode number of the One-Punch Man anime
