= Saitama (One-Punch Man) =

Fictional character and protagonist from One-Punch Man

- One-Punch Man character
- Saitama, as illustrated by Yusuke Murata
- First appearance: Chapter #1: One Punch (2009)
- Created by: One; Yusuke Murata
- Voiced by: Japanese: Makoto Furukawa; English: Max Mittelman; French: Orelsan

In-universe information
- Nicknames: Caped Baldy; Bald Cape
- Species: Human
- Gender: Male
- Occupation: Superhero
- Fighting style: Brawling

Saitama (Japanese: サイタマ) is a superhero and the titular protagonist of the Japanese manga and anime series One-Punch Man created by One. He is an unaffiliated superhero from Z-City who dreams of fame and performs heroic acts as a hobby. For three years straight, Saitama had trained enough to become the strongest being that can defeat any enemy with a single punch due to his limitless and exponentially growing physical prowess. However, his overwhelming power leaves him without real challenges, leading to boredom and a sense of emptiness. He becomes the reluctant mentor of Genos, a cybernetic hero seeking revenge on the one who killed his family and destroyed his hometown, after Saitama saves him from a powerful monster. Through Genos, Saitama learns about the Hero Association, a professional organization that combats monsters and protects the Earth.

The character was created by One as part of a webcomic involving an alternate style of superhero who already started as the strongest one in the world and most of his stories involved daily chores. For the manga serialization, Saitama was illustrated by Yusuke Murata.

In October 2015, an anime adaptation was released. In the anime adaptation, Saitama is voiced by Makoto Furukawa in Japanese and Max Mittelman in the English dub.

== Creation ==
Japanese manga author One became interested in creating a comic superhero who was already the strongest in the world. He wanted to focus on different aspects of storytelling than those normally relied on in standard superhero stories, such as everyday problems. He said: "Punching is oftentimes pretty useless against life's problems. But inside One-Punch Man's universe, I made Saitama a sort of guy who was capable of adapting his life to the world that surrounded him, only armed with his immense power. The only obstacles he faces are mundane things, like running short of money." One came up with Saitama's simplistic design when thinking about how "the world is full of cool looking heroes."

The plot of the manga was that Saitama became bored with his superhero lifestyle and instead resorted to dealing with daily life. In One's point of view, a hero is not cool for being strong or strength, instead it being the mentality of Saitama and how he is able to understand other people's mentalities. One had difficulties in drawing scenarios for Saitama due to how overpowered he was; all Saitama would do is to immediately punch the problem away. One felt that Saitama's journey made the story interesting; the only difficult part is to make his allies seem not too weak.

Artist Yusuke Murata initially drew him in a "cool" way alongside the entire cast. He attempted to make Saitama look handsome and added stars in his eyes, but all of these ideas were scrapped; Murata changed it due to One intending Saitama to be the complete opposite. Nevertheless, he had fun when drawing the character. The blank expression Saitama tends to make was done intentionally for comedic effect. Murata also elaborated that while it is hard to relate to overpowered characters in fiction, the way One wrote Saitama managed to do it well.

=== Casting ===
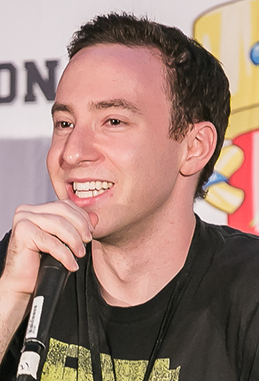
Max Mittelman voices Saitama in the anime's English dub.

Saitama is voiced by Makoto Furukawa in the Japanese version and by Max Mittelman in the English dub. Furukawa first learned of the series thanks to a friend who had the manga. He felt that the story, in which each arc is completed in a short number of episodes, and that Saitama always finishes with a quick blow to defeat the enemy at the end, is simple yet very interesting. Additionally, his first impression of Saitama was so strong that he was worried about whether he would be able to play it. He was surprised that he was really the strongest hero because the gap between his daily life and fighting was appealing. Furukawa called him "complex" due to his lack of motivation and not being attentive enough while his chores are part of what make him charm which made him relatable. The actor explained that Saitama has two different tone based on the scenes he is involved making him both cool and uncool.

Mittelman was attracted by the series' first episode and found hilarious how Saitama dresses in contrast to the menacing villains. In getting the role, he wanted to make sure he got appropriate balance between being bored but not lazy and "a little detached". He expressed difficulties in emulating Furukawa, claiming his performance would come as "crazy" due to the differences between the Japanese and the English versions.

== Appearances ==
Saitama is a bald-headed 25-year-old man who is bored of fighting because he is able to effortlessly defeat enemies with a single punch.^{Vol. 1} He lives in an apartment in City Z. Three years prior to the start of the series, when he still had hair, Saitama was job hunting when he defeated the powerful supervillain Crablante that attempted to kill a child with a butt-chin.^{Ch. 2} Saitama says he became a hero "for the fun of it".^{Ch. 5} His abilities mainly consist of physical abilities magnified to an immeasurable degree: strength is the true power of Saitama, with speed, stamina, and durability being mere side-effects. He attributes this to a daily training regimen (100 push-ups, 100 sit-ups, 100 squats, a 10 km run, eating healthy food, and abstaining from use of the air conditioner or heater in order to reinforce his mental fortitude.) (He also mentions training even when his body was wounded and made strange cracking sounds). Three years of this spartan training pushed Saitama to his limits, making him evidently unbeatable.^{Ch. 11} Early in the series, he picks up a disciple and roommate, Genos.^{Vol. 1}

Though he had broken all the physical records in the Hero entrance exam by huge margins, Saitama enters the Hero Association with a score of 71, giving him one of the lowest ranks in the Hero Association. This is due to his miserable performance on the mental exam.^{Web ch. 16-17,}^{Ch. 16} He soon goes up the ranks by performing many deeds, although many of his efforts are not recognized because of collateral damage or higher-tiered superheroes receiving more credit. These include defeating the raging ninja supervillain/assassin known as Speed-o'-Sound Sonic (who became his unlikely rival) and destroying a meteor similar to Chicxulub, each with a single punch. As of the current arc of the webcomic by ONE, he is A-Class rank 39. Regardless of his rank, he does not mind giving others the credit, as demonstrated in his actions following the fight against the Deep Sea King. In the Dark Matter Thieves story arc, he is unfazed by the telekinesis of a powerful esper, further displaying his resistance. This arc was also one of the only times he has used his "serious punch", defeating the world-conquering leader of the aliens, Lord Boros. It was also revealed that Saitama's power can continue to grow limitless as demonstrated during his fight with Cosmic Garou, with the latter leaving him behind on the power scaling through every blows exchanged. Through various circumstances, he makes connections with Mumen Rider, Bang, King, and Blizzard. His superhero name in the association is Bald Cape (ハゲマント, Hagemanto; Anime: Caped Baldy).^{Ch. 45} Many characters, as Garou and Sonic, seek to defeat Saitama. Since he is the strongest character in the anime, there are characters who see defeating him as an achievement they wish to accomplish in order to boost their egos. However, everyone that comes against Saitama falls short due to their lacking abilities compared to him.

The character is also featured in One-Punch Man: A Hero Nobody Knows video game.

== Reception ==
=== Popularity ===
Saitama ranked first in a popularity poll from the manga. He was nominated for Best Protagonist at the 4th Crunchyroll Anime Awards in 2020. In Animax Carnival Malaysia 2016, an attraction of the series challenged the guests to punch harder than the character. Several types of merchandising were also created, including rigid and articulated vinyl figures from well known brands such like Banpresto, or beanies by Ensky Hobby. In 2019, a Singaporean man named known as Seah replicated Saitama's workout he mentions early in the series to become fit, showing positive results in the process.

=== Critical reception ===
Critical response to Saitama has been mostly positive. Anime News Network enjoyed his early chapters and his relationship with Genos for how hilarious the duo are. For the series, Den of Geek commented the series' biggest appeal were not the fight scenes but instead Saitama's comical scenes whenever he is disappointed with a villain which act as a satire from fighting series. However, the first season's ending was praised for mixing both elements of the narrative into two episodes where Saitama makes a dull expression before becoming serious in a fight for the first time. IGN agreed stating the series does a fine job at how Saitama properly ends most of his fights in a different fashion.

Comic Book Resources praised chapter 165 as it portrayed Saitama at his biggest which several readers have always been looking forward to though there is no sense of happiness to his feats. SportsKeeda listed Saitama as the series' strongest character twice but wondered if the recently introduced character, God, might be able to defeat the title character. Screen Rant also listed Saitama as the strongest character in anime history. SportsKeeda noted several fandoms tend to be split on who is the strongest character in two series: Saitama or Goku from Dragon Ball. Anime News Network compared Saitama with All Might, a famous character from the manga series, My Hero Academia among Western superheroes, stating that despite their similar concepts, the narrative is far different. Nevertheless, the writer said that all of them give the idea of self improvement to the fans. Furukawa's performance as Saitama was also praised.

Panic at the Discourse writer Joe Yang stated that when Saitama defeats the monster Deep Sea King, he sacrifices his own reputation by not taking credit as he "upholds the ideology of the hero's association" giving depths of to reflex in how heroes are recognized in fiction. Yang expressed contrast between Saitama and the Marvel heroes and instead compared him with anime heroes like Naruto Uzumaki, Goku, Ichigo Kurosaki, among others as they do not act like heroes either. Yang placed emphasis on Saitama's origins as a failed "salaryman masculinity" common in the Showa era as well as how he is not approved by Hero Association as an important hero by society. In concluding, Yang believes that One wrote Saitama as an example of salarymen.
