= One-Punch Man =

Japanese manga series

- First tankōbon volume cover, featuring Saitama

ワンパンマン (Wanpanman)
- Genre: Action; Comedy; Superhero
- Manga

Webcomic
- Written by: One
- Published by: Self-published
- Original run: 2009 – present
- Manga

Jump remake
- Written by: One
- Illustrated by: Yusuke Murata
- Published by: Shueisha
- English publisher: NA: Viz Media
- Imprint: Jump Comics
- Magazine: Tonari no Young Jump
- English magazine: NA: Weekly Shonen Jump
- Original run: June 14, 2012 – present
- Volumes: 37
- Anime television series
- Directed by: Shingo Natsume (S1); Chikara Sakurai (S2); Shinpei Nagai (S3)
- Produced by: Chinatsu Matsui; Nobuyuki Hosoya; Keita Kodama (S1); Ayuri Taguchi (S1); Sōta Satō (S2); Kōhei Fukuda (S2); Yuichiro Fukushi (S1/a); Atsushi Fujishiro (S2/a)
- Written by: Tomohiro Suzuki
- Music by: Makoto Miyazaki
- Studio: Madhouse (S1); J.C.Staff (S2–3)
- Licensed by: Crunchyroll (Note: In the United Kingdom through Kazé and the rest of Europe through Crunchyroll SAS); AUS/NA: Viz Media; SA/SEA: Muse Communication
- Original network: TV Tokyo, AT-X; TVO, TVQ, BS Japan (S1); TVA (S2); TXN (TV Tokyo) (S3)
- English network: SEA: Animax Asia; US: Adult Swim (Toonami)
- Original run: October 5, 2015 – present
- Episodes: 36 + 12 OVAs
- Original animation DVD

One-Punch Man: Road to Hero
- Directed by: Shingo Natsume
- Produced by: Chinatsu Matsui; Nobuyuki Hosoya; Keita Kodama; Ayuri Taguchi
- Written by: Tomohiro Suzuki
- Music by: Makoto Miyazaki
- Studio: Madhouse
- Released: December 4, 2015
- Runtime: 24 minutes
- Video games
- One-Punch Man: A Hero Nobody Knows (2019); One Punch Man: Road to Hero (2019)
- icon

One-Punch Man (Japanese: ワンパンマン, Hepburn: Wanpanman) is a Japanese manga series created by One, originally released as a webcomic in early 2009. It tells the story of Saitama, an independent superhero who, having trained to the point that he can defeat any opponent with a single punch, grows deeply bored from a lack of challenge. He sets out to find stronger opponents, while making allies of other heroes as well.

A digital manga remake, illustrated by Yusuke Murata, began publication on Shueisha's Tonari no Young Jump website in June 2012. Its chapters are periodically compiled and published into individual tankōbon volumes. As of July 2026, 37 volumes have been released. In North America, Viz Media licensed the manga remake for English language release and has serialized it in its Weekly Shonen Jump digital magazine.

An anime adaptation produced by Madhouse was broadcast in Japan from October to December 2015. A second season, produced by J.C.Staff, was broadcast from April to July 2019. A third season, also by J.C.Staff, aired from October to December 2025; its second cours is set to premiere in January 2027. Licensed in North America by Viz Media, the series aired its first season in the United States on Adult Swim's Toonami programming block from July to October 2016. The second season also aired on the block from October 2019 to January 2020.

By June 2012, the original webcomic manga surpassed 7.9 million hits. By July 2026, the manga remake had over 38 million copies in circulation.

== Plot ==
On a supercontinent version of Earth, ravaged by monstrous threats, the Hero Association mobilizes superheroes to defend humanity. Among them stands Saitama, an unaffiliated hero from City Z whose rigorous training regimen granted him invincible strength—capable of ending any battle with a single punch. This absolute power has left him disillusioned, longing for an opponent who can reignite his passion for combat. His solitary existence changes when he encounters Genos, a cybernetic warrior seeking vengeance against the machine that annihilated his hometown. After witnessing Saitama effortlessly defeat the monstrous Mosquito Girl—an adversary who had nearly killed him—Genos becomes his devoted disciple.

The Hero Association's ranking system soon exposes its superficial nature. Despite his godlike abilities, Saitama's poor written exam results relegate him to C-Class, while Genos immediately attains the elite S-Class designation. When Saitama single-handedly stops an asteroid impact and later defeats the amphibious terror Deep Sea King, public opinion turns against other superheroes for their comparative weakness. In characteristic selflessness, Saitama deliberately draws criticism onto himself to protect his peers' reputations.

This cycle of duty and public ingratitude continues until the alien warlord Boros arrives, fulfilling the dying prophecy of seer Shibabawa. While the Association's forces battle Boros's army, Saitama confronts the conqueror in a one-sided duel that ends with his signature finishing move. The victory only deepens his existential crisis—even the "Dominator of the Universe" fails to challenge him.

Simultaneously, the emergence of Garo, the self-styled "Hero Hunter", coincides with escalating monster attacks. A disgraced martial artist scarred by childhood bullying, Garo develops pathological hatred for hero culture. His violent campaign intersects with the Monster Association's schemes—a subterranean organization transforming humans into monsters. When they kidnap a Hero Association executive's son, Garo forms an unlikely bond with Tareo, a hero-worshipping child, before both are captured.

The resulting assault on the Monster Association's headquarters becomes history's most destructive battle, reducing much of City Z to ruins. During the conflict, Saitama encounters Blast, the mysterious top-ranked superhero, who warns of an apocalyptic entity called "God". The battle climaxes when Garo, mutated into monstrous form, receives cosmic power from this entity and slaughters numerous superheroes—including Genos, whose core he destroys to provoke Saitama.

Their subsequent cataclysmic battle spans the solar system before Saitama prevails. Garo despairs at his inability to defeat Saitama before realizing that his actions resulted in Tareo's death. He reveals his true intentions: he wanted to be the world's singular evil in order to spread unity and protect the weak, like Tareo. In his final moments, Garo teaches Saitama time travel, enabling him to prevent this dark future. Returning to the past, Saitama subdues Garo preemptively, with only Genos retaining memories of the original timeline.

In the aftermath, Saitama's promotion to A-Class coincides with the Hero Association's crumbling credibility. Heroes dissatisfied with the association join the Neo Heroes, a rival group led by the enigmatic Blue—claiming to be Blast's son.

The new faction claims to optimize hero work, forgoing the hero ranking system and unfair treatment of differently ranked heroes. Neo Heroes are also given battle suits, armored vehicles, and proper equipment all while being led by Neo Leaders consisting of former S-Class heroes and other powerful figures.

Unbeknown to most, this faction harbors sinister ambitions of mass cyberization. Amidst all this, Drive Knight reveals to Genos that Metal Knight is responsible for the Mad Cyborg. Subsequently, Dr. Kuseno is assassinated by Machine Gods sent by the Organization, who launch an invasion consisting of millions of robots into every city, igniting a mechanized conflict potentially tied to Genos's past.

== Production ==
One began writing the original webcomic of One-Punch Man in 2009. The Japanese shortened name Wanpanman is a play on the long-running children's character Anpanman, with wanpan being a contraction of wanpanchi ("one punch"). One became interested in creating a superhero who was already the strongest in the world. He wanted to focus on different aspects of storytelling than those normally relied on in standard superhero stories, such as everyday problems. One said: "Punching is oftentimes pretty useless against life's problems. But inside One-Punch Man's universe, I made Saitama a sort of guy who was capable of adapting his life to the world that surrounded him, only armed with his immense power. The only obstacles he faces are mundane things, like running short of money."

One has taken several breaks from the webcomic. In February 2010, he put the series on hiatus, deciding to take a one-year break due to family circumstances. After releasing the 109th chapter in January 2017, One took a two-year break, releasing the following chapter in April 2019. When One returned to drawing in 2011, he was contacted by artist Yusuke Murata about a possible partnership in which Murata would redraw the webcomic for One. Murata had been an enormous fan of One-Punch Man and was ill at the time. Fearing he was going to die, he contacted One. Looking back, he said, "Around that time, I was actually really sick. I broke out in hives, my inner organs were infected, and I couldn't breathe well with my windpipes [sic] swelling. I was in the hospital when I thought, 'Ah, I guess people die just like that.' If I'm going to die, I want to do something I really love to do. I want to draw manga with Mr. One. That's what I thought." Murata, already a successful manga artist, used his connections in the industry to get a publishing deal with Weekly Young Jump magazine. The manga became a digital publication on Weekly Young Jump's spin-off manga website Tonari no Young Jump (となりのヤングジャンプ, Tonari no Yangu Janpu), published by Shueisha.

== Media ==
=== Webcomic ===
The webcomic version of One-Punch Man was created and released by One in 2009. He self-published the series on the Japanese manga website Nitosha.net. As of July 2025, the webcomic has 155 chapters.

=== Manga ===
The manga remake of One-Punch Man is illustrated by Yusuke Murata. It has been published on Shueisha's Tonari no Young Jump website since June 14, 2012. The chapters are periodically collected and published in tankōbon volumes, with the first volume published on December 4, 2012. A radio drama CD was bundled with the ninth volume released in August 2015. As of July 3, 2026, 37 volumes have been published.

In North America, the series began publication in Viz Media's Weekly Shonen Jump (Shonen Jump Alpha at the time) on January 21, 2013. The first e-book was released in February 2014. In June 2014, One-Punch Man was one of a number of series that Viz made available on the digital distribution platform ComiXology. The manga has been released in print in North America since September 2015.

=== Anime ===
==== Season 1 ====
An anime adaptation was announced in the 15th issue of Weekly Young Jump on March 10, 2015. The first season was directed by Shingo Natsume and written by Tomohiro Suzuki, with animation by Madhouse. The series features character designs by Chikashi Kubota, who also served as chief animation director. The music was composed by Makoto Miyazaki, with art design by Shigemi Ikeda and Yukiko Maruyama. Ken Hashimoto served as the color key artist, Akane Fushihara served as the director of photography, Kashiko Kimura served as editor, and Shoji Hata served as sound designer. One-Punch Man's first season ran for 12 episodes. It aired in Japan from October 5 to December 21, 2015, on TV Tokyo. It aired later on Television Osaka (TVO), TVQ Kyushu Broadcasting (TVQ), Kyoto Broadcasting System (KBS), BS Japan, and AT-X. The season was streamed on Niconico and was simulcast on Hulu, Daisuki, and Viz Media's Neon Alley service. A preview screening of the first two episodes was held at the Saitama City Cultural Center on September 6, 2015. The opening theme song is "The Hero!! Ikareru Ken ni Honō o Tsukero" (THE HERO!! ～怒れる拳に火をつけろ～; lit. 'The Hero!! Set Fire to the Furious Fist'), performed by JAM Project, while the ending theme song is "Hoshi Yori Saki ni Mitsukete Ageru" (星より先に見つけてあげる; lit. 'I'll Find It Before the Stars for You'), performed by Hiroko Moriguchi. An original animation DVD (OAD) was released with the tenth manga volume on December 4, 2015. Additional original video animation (OVA) episodes are included with home media volumes of the season, the first of which was released on December 24, 2015.

The series is licensed by Viz Media in North America, Latin America, and Oceania. Viz Media announced they were working on an English-language dub of One-Punch Man at Anime Boston 2016. On July 1, 2016, it was announced during Toonami's Anime Expo panel that the series would begin airing on July 17, which ended its first season on October 9, 2016. (Note: Adult Swim lists the series as premiering on July 16, 2016, at 12:00 a.m. ET/PT, which is effectively July 17.) The series has been also licensed by Viz Media Europe in Europe, the Middle East, and Africa. Kaze UK and Manga Entertainment handle the distribution of the series in the United Kingdom. Madman Entertainment handles distribution in Australia and New Zealand, and also simulcast the series on AnimeLab.

==== Season 2 ====
A second season was confirmed in September 2016. On September 25, 2017, it was announced that One-Punch Man would be changing both its production company and director. The second season was animated by J.C.Staff, with Chikara Sakurai replacing Shingo Natsume as director and Yoshikazu Iwanami replacing Shoji Hata as sound director. Tomohiro Suzuki, Chikashi Kubota, and Makoto Miyazaki returned to their roles as series composer, character designer, and composer, respectively. The opening theme song is "Uncrowned Greatest Hero" (静寂のアポストル, Seijaku no Apostle; lit. 'Quiet Apostle'), performed by JAM Project, while the ending theme song is "Chizu ga Nakutemo Modoru kara" (地図が無くても戻るから; lit. 'Even Without a Map, I'll Return'), performed by Makoto Furukawa. The second season aired from April 10 to July 3, 2019, with a recap special covering the first season having aired a week before broadcast on April 3. A ten-minute OVA was bundled with the second season's first home media volume on October 25, 2019. Two more OVAs were bundled with the second season's second and third home media volume on November 26 and December 25, 2019, respectively. Another OVA was bundled with the second season's fourth home media volume on January 28, 2020. The fifth OVA was bundled with the second season's fifth home media volume on February 27, 2020.

The second season was simulcast on Hulu in the US, on Tubi in Canada, on AnimeLab in Australia and New Zealand and on Crunchyroll in Europe. The season aired on Toonami from October 12, 2019, to January 12, 2020.

==== Season 3 ====
In August 2022, it was announced that the series would receive a third season. Most of the main cast and staff from the second season are reprising their roles. Shinpei Nagai is replacing Chikara Sakurai as the season's director, Sakura Murakami replaces both Shigemi Ikeda and Yukiko Maruyama as the art director, and Yuki Hirose replaces Yoshio Ōkouchi as the director of photography. The third season aired from October 12 to December 28, 2025, with a recap special covering the second season airing a week before broadcast on October 5. The second cours of the season is set to premiere in January 2027. The first opening theme song is "Get No Satisfied!", performed by JAM Project featuring Babymetal, while the first ending theme song is "Soko ni Aru Akari" (そこに有る灯り; lit. 'The Light, That's There'), performed by Makoto Furukawa. The second opening theme song is "Never Done: Supreme Power vs Ultimate Fear" (Never Done～最強VS最恐～, Nebā Dan: Saikyō vs Saikyō), performed by JAM Project, while the second ending theme song is "Wakusei no Katusumi" (惑星の形, Wakusei no Katachi; lit. 'Corner of the Planet'), performed by Furukawa.

The third season is streaming on Hulu in the United States and Disney+ in Canada, and on Crunchyroll in Europe and Middle East.

=== Video games ===
On June 25, 2019, One-Punch Man: A Hero Nobody Knows was announced for the PlayStation 4, Xbox One, and PC. It was released in Japan on February 27, 2020, and in North America and Europe on February 28 of the same year. On August 22, 2019, a mobile game titled One Punch Man: Road to Hero was released for iOS and Android.

Blizzard Entertainment announced an Overwatch × One-Punch Man crossover collaboration event in February 2023, which ran from March 7 to April 6 of the same year. The collaboration included multiple skins and a custom loading screen; the skins included a Saitama-inspired one for Doomfist, a Genos-inspired one for Genji, a Mumen Rider-inspired one for Soldier: 76, and a Terrible Tornado-inspired one for Kiriko.

=== Live-action film ===
On April 21, 2020, Sony's Columbia Pictures announced that a live-action film adaptation was in development. Scott Rosenberg and Jeff Pinkner were signed on as writers, with Avi Arad serving as producer. On June 13, 2022, Justin Lin was revealed to be the film's director and co-producer, with the film set to enter production later in the year. In April 2024, Dan Harmon and Heather Anne Campbell were reported to be hired to rewrite the script.

== Reception ==
=== Webcomic ===
The webcomic was a success shortly after its inception, receiving thousands of views and comments within weeks. It received 7.9 million hits by June 2012. According to One, by the time he had written the fifth chapter, he was receiving 30 comments per update (on Nitosha.net, a series was considered "popular" if it consistently received at least 30 comments). The number of comments gradually increased, and by the time One had published the 30th chapter, he was receiving nearly 1,000 comments per update.

=== Manga ===
One-Punch Man was one of the Manga Division's Jury Recommended Works at the 17th and 18th installments of the Japan Media Arts Festival in 2013 and 2014, respectively. The series was nominated for the seventh annual Manga Taishō Award in 2014. It was nominated for an Eisner Award in 2015, and a Harvey Award in 2016. The manga won the Sugoi Japan Award and the Spanish Manga Barcelona award for the seinen category in 2017.

One-Punch Man was the ninth best-selling manga of 2016, with over 3.9 million copies sold. It was the eighth best-selling manga of 2017, with over 3.2 million copies sold. The manga had 2.2 million copies in circulation by November 2013. By July 2017, the manga had 13 million copies in circulation; by July 2019, this had grown to 20 million copies in circulation. By April 2020, the series had sold over 30 million copies worldwide. By August 2025, it had over 34 million copies in circulation. By March 2026, it had over 36 million copies in circulation. By July 2026, it had over 38 million copies in circulation.

Once released in the United States, both the first and second volumes debuted on the New York Times Manga Best Sellers list, in first and second place respectively, and remained there for two weeks. Volume one dropped to second place for the third week, while volume two fell off the list altogether. In July 2019, the first volume of the series had been on the list for 71 weeks.

=== Anime ===
The first season of the anime received critical acclaim, receiving praise for its uniqueness, animation, humor, characters and fight scenes. On review aggregator Rotten Tomatoes, it holds an approval rating of 100% based on 12 reviews, with an average rating of 8.4/10. The site's critics consensus reads, "With its state-of-the-art animation, unorthodox hero, and gut-bustlingly [sic] funny jabs at the shounen genre, One-Punch Man is simply a knockout."

The second season received mixed reviews. Although the humor, characters, and story were still praised, reviewers unanimously criticized the drop in the quality of the animation following the change of studios. The direction, pacing, and fights were also criticized, as was the last episode for feeling like an improper season finale. Screen Rant noted that fan reaction to the season was divided, with their response to the new animation being notably negative. They criticized the drop of quality in animation as well as the change of director, saying "One-Punch Man was previously crisp, detailed and fluid, but many fans claim that the latest season has felt static, bland and uninspiring. This is almost certainly down to a change in director. [The series] has gone from the pinnacle of TV anime visuals to looking like just another weekly series." However, they believed the season "improves in terms of story, character and world-building", although they mostly attributed this to the original manga it was based on rather than the anime series' staff. They were very critical of the season finale, noting how the anime could have adapted one or two extra manga chapters to offer a more conclusive finale and build excitement towards a third season.

IGN gave the second season a 5 out of 10 rating, calling it "mediocre". Although they felt the humor and characters were on par with the first season, they were very critical of the animation and pacing, saying: "[the animation was] taking horrendous shortcuts to get the fights done and dusted in as simple a way as possible. Gone are the intricately detailed character action shots, with dynamic slow motion and constantly-shifting camerawork. Instead, we have flashes, cuts to black, and machine-gun punches all reminiscent of the drawn-out fight scenes of Dragon Ball Z from more than twenty years ago." They concluded saying: "Season 2 of One-Punch Man is a half-baked jumble of poor and lazy animation that is far more concerned with staying relevant than being crafted into something worthy of the season that came before it. If you're only in it for the advancement of the plot, it's all here. But it's also all in the manga, and that looks an awful lot better than this season."

In 2020, One-Punch Man won the "Most In-Demand Export from Asia" at the second Global TV Demand Awards. At the 4th Crunchyroll Anime Awards, Saitama and Garou were nominated for "Best Protagonist" and "Best Antagonist" respectively.

The first part of the third season received overwhelmingly negative reviews. Game Rant noted that the "quality of the art, animation, and direction is all subpar", recommending fans keep reading the manga instead of watching the anime. GamesRadar+ reported on complaints regarding the slideshow-like presentation of the season. A scene in which Garou slides down a hill became viral and was widely criticized online. Anime News Network named the third season's first part as the worst anime of 2025, criticizing the studio's production, art, and animation quality.
