= One-Punch Man: A Hero Nobody Knows =

2020 superhero video game

- Developer: Spike Chunsoft
- Publisher: Bandai Namco Entertainment
- Series: One-Punch Man
- Engine: Unreal Engine 4
- Platforms: PlayStation 4; Windows; Xbox One
- Release: JP: February 27, 2020; WW: February 28, 2020
- Genres: Fighting; RPG
- Modes: Single-player, multiplayer

One-Punch Man: A Hero Nobody Knows is a fighting RPG video game developed by Spike Chunsoft and published by Bandai Namco Entertainment on February 28, 2020, for PlayStation 4, Windows, and Xbox One. The game is based on the manga series One-Punch Man.

== Gameplay ==
The game is a 3D fighting game in which one to two players battle using teams of three characters. The title character Saitama is invulnerable to other characters' attacks, and can defeat them in a single punch, but if a player picks him for their team, he will arrive late to the battle; as such, that player needs to make it through the match with the other two characters in their team until Saitama arrives. An alternative version of Saitama without these attributes, called the "Dream Version", is also playable.

=== Characters ===
- Atomic Samurai
- Boros
- Carnage Kabuto
- Child Emperor
- Crablante
- Custom Hero
- Deep Sea King
- Garou (DLC)
- Genos
- Handsome Kamen Amai Mask
- Hellish Blizzard
- "Lightning Max" Max (DLC)
- Melzargard
- Metal Bat
- Metal Knight
- Mosquito Girl
- Mumen Rider
- Puri-Puri Prisoner
- Saitama
- Saitama (Dream Version)
- Silverfang
- "Snakebite" Snek
- Speed-o'-Sound Sonic
- Spring Mustachio
- Stinger
- Suiryu (DLC)
- Tank-Top Blackhole
- Tank-Top Master
- Tank-Top Tiger
- "Terrible Tornado" Tatsumaki
- Vaccine Man
- Watchdog Man (DLC)

== Development ==
One-Punch Man: A Hero Nobody Knows was developed by Spike Chunsoft, and is based on the manga series One-Punch Man.

The game was announced in June 2019, and was released by Bandai Namco Entertainment in Japan for PlayStation 4 and Xbox One on February 27, 2020, and internationally for PlayStation 4, Windows, and Xbox One.

On July 20, 2021, it was announced by Bandai Namco that all online servers will be closed by 2022.

== Reception ==
Reception

Aggregate scores
| Aggregator | Score |
|---|---|
| Metacritic | PS4: 57/100; XONE: 59/100 |
| OpenCritic | 18% recommend |

Review scores
| Publication | Score |
|---|---|
| Famitsu | 29/40 (7, 7, 7, 8) |
| IGN | 6/10 |
| Push Square | 6/10 |
| Shacknews | 6/10 |

The game received mixed reviews from critics, but was nominated for The Game Awards 2020 in the best fighting game category. While the story mode was praised, the gameplay and visuals were considered unpolished and too simplistic. Reviewers were polarized on the gimmick revolving around Saitama's invincibility, with some praising it for its uniqueness, and others considering it a fatally flawed concept rendering all other characters useless and making multiplayer mode completely unbalanced unless both players picked Saitama.

The physical PlayStation 4 game was the 18th highest selling physical video game in Japan during its debut week, with an estimated 4,500 copies sold; by its second week on sale, it no longer charted on Famitsu's weekly top 30 sales chart.
