= Chikashi Kubota =

Japanese animator (born 1978)

- 久保田 誓
- Born: August 29, 1978 (age 48); Katsushika, Japan
- Occupations: Animator, Character Designer, Animation Director
- Notable work: Corpse Princess; FLCL (Progressive); One-Punch Man; Robotics;Notes

Japanese name
- Kanji: 久保田 誓
- Hiragana: くぼた ちかし
- Romanization: Kubota Chikashi

Chikashi Kubota (Japanese: 久保田 誓, Hepburn: Kubota Chikashi; born August 29, 1978) is a Japanese animator, character designer and animation director. He is notable for his character design works for Corpse Princess, FLCL Progressive, One-Punch Man and Robotics;Notes.

== Career ==
Born and raised in Katsushika, Kubota joined Xebec after working at Toei Animation Institute, and later worked at Gainax. Since then, he has provided many episode animation directions for various shows, and key animation for various movies, as well as designed the characters for Corpse Princess, One-Punch Man, FLCL, and Robotics;Notes.

In 2016, Kubota won in the "best animator" category at the Tokyo Anime Award.

== Works ==
=== TV Anime ===
| Year | Title | Credit | Note |
|---|---|---|---|
| 2002-03 | Ojamajo Doremi Dokkān! | Key Animation (eps. 40) | |
| 2002-03 | Petite Princess Yucie | Key Animation (eps. 1, 7, 26) | |
| 2008 | Corpse Princess: Aka | Character Design, Animation Director (OP; eps. 12) | |
| 2009 | Corpse Princess: Kuro | Character Design, Animation Director (OP; eps. 11), Key Animation (OP) | |
| 2011 | Marvel Anime X-Men | Key Animation (OP) | |
| 2012-13 | From the New World | Main Character Design, Animation Director (eps. 1, 25), Assistant Animation Director (eps. 8), Key Animation (eps. 25) | |
| 2012-13 | Robotics;Notes | Animation Character Design | |
| 2015 | One-Punch Man | Character Design, Chief Animation Director (eps. 2–11), Animation Director (OP, ED; eps. 1, 12), Key Animation (eps. 12) | Season 1 |
| 2018 | FLCL Progressive | Character Design, Animation Director (eps. 1) | |
| 2019 | One-Punch Man | Character Design | Season 2 |
| 2019 | Pocket Monsters: Sun & Moon | Key Animation (eps. 144) | |
| 2020-22 | Dragon Quest: The Adventure of Dai | Key Animation (eps. 98) | |
| 2024-25 | Dragon Ball Daima | Chief Animation Director (eps. 1), Key Animation (eps. 1, 20) | |
| 2025–present | One-Punch Man | Character Design | Season 3 Co-character design with Shinjiro Kuroda and Ryōnosuke Shirokawa |
| 2027 | Go with the Clouds, North-by-Northwest | Character Design | |

=== Anime film ===
| Year | Title | Credit | Note |
|---|---|---|---|
| 2001 | Digimon Tamers: Battle of Adventurers | Key Animation | |
| 2002 | Digimon Tamers: Runaway Locomon | Key Animation | |
| 2005 | One Piece: Baron Omatsuri and the Secret Island | Character Design, Animation Director | |
| 2005 | Tsubasa Reservoir Chronicle the Movie: The Princess in the Birdcage Kingdom | Key Animation | |
| 2006 | The Girl Who Leapt Through Time | Animation Director | |
| 2018 | FLCL Progressive: The Movie | Character Design | |
| 2018 | Dragon Ball Super: Broly | Key Animation | |
| 2022 | Dragon Ball Super: Super Hero | Chief Animation Director | |
| 2022 | Suzume | Key Animation | |
| 2023 | Pretty Guardian Sailor Moon Cosmos The Movie | Key Animation (Part 2) | 2-Part film |
