= List of One-Punch Man episodes =

One-Punch Man is a Japanese anime television series based on the webcomic of the same name written by One and its subsequent manga remake illustrated by Yusuke Murata. Set in City Z, the story focuses on Saitama, a superhero who has grown bored as he has become so powerful that all of his battles end in a single punch. The first season was directed by Shingo Natsume at Madhouse and written by Tomohiro Suzuki. The series also features character design by Chikashi Kubota, who also served as chief animation director, and music by Makoto Miyazaki.

The first season aired in Japan on TV Tokyo and other networks from October 5 to December 21, 2015, and was simulcast internationally by Daisuki and Hulu. An original animation DVD (OAD) was bundled and released with the special edition 10th manga volume on December 4, 2015. Additional original video animations (OVAs) are included in Blu-ray and DVD volumes of the series, which began releasing from December 24, 2015. It is licensed in North America, Latin America and Oceania by Viz Media, and by Viz Media Europe in Europe, the Middle East and Africa. The series was streamed worldwide excluding Asia on Daisuki. Viz Media streamed the series on Neon Alley in North America. Kazé UK and Manga Entertainment distributes the series in the United Kingdom and Ireland, and Madman Entertainment distributes the series in Australia and New Zealand, who also streamed the series on AnimeLab. The season's English dub aired in the United States on Adult Swim's Toonami programming block from July 17 to October 9, 2016. (Note: Adult Swim lists the series premiere as airing on July 16 at 12:00 a.m. (24:00) EDT/PDT, which is effectively July 17.)

A second season was announced in September 2016. The second season is animated by J.C. Staff with Chikara Sakurai replacing Shingo Natsume as series director and Yoshikazu Iwanami replacing Shoji Hata as sound director. Tomohiro Suzuki, Chikashi Kubota and Makoto Miyazaki reprised their roles as series composer, character designer and music composer, respectively. The season aired from April 10 to July 3, 2019, with a recap special covering the first season having aired a week before broadcast on April 3, 2019, on TV Tokyo and other channels. It was simulcast on Hulu in the United States, on Tubi in Canada, on AnimeLab in Australia and New Zealand, and on Crunchyroll in Europe. The season's English dub aired on Adult Swim's Toonami programming block from October 12, 2019, to January 12, 2020.

A 10-minute OVA was bundled with the second season's first Blu-ray & DVD volume on October 25, 2019. Two more 10-minute OVAs were bundled with the second season's second and third Blu-ray & DVD volume on November 26 and December 25, 2019, respectively. Another 10-minute OVA was bundled with the second season's fourth Blu-ray & DVD volume on January 28, 2020. The 5th OVA was bundled with the second season's fifth Blu-ray & DVD volume on February 27, 2020.

A third season was announced in August 2022. The main cast and staff from the second season are reprising their roles. The season's first cours aired from October 12 to December 29, 2025, on TV Tokyo and its affiliates, with a recap special covering the second season airing a week before broadcast on October 5. A second cours was announced immediately following the conclusion of the first and is set to premiere in January 2027. Shinpei Nagai replaced Chikara Sakurai as series director, Sakura Murakami replaced Shigemi Ikeda and Yukiko Maruyama as art director, and Yuki Hirose replaced Yoshio Ōkouchi as director of photography.

== Series overview ==
Season	Episodes		Originally released	
Season	Episodes		First released	Last released
1	12		October 5, 2015	December 21, 2015
2	12		April 10, 2019	July 3, 2019
3	TBA	12	October 12, 2025	December 29, 2025
3	TBA	TBA	January 2027	TBA

== Episodes ==
=== Season 1 (2015) ===
No. overall	No. in season	Title	Directed by	Storyboarded by	Animation directed by	Original release date (Note: TV Tokyo lists the series premiere as airing on October 4 at 25:05, which is effectively October 5 at 1:05 a.m. JST.)	English air date
1	1	"The Strongest Man"; Transliteration: "Saikyō no Otoko" (Japanese: 最強の男)	Shingo Natsume	Shingo Natsume	Chikashi Kubota	October 5, 2015	July 17, 2016
2	2	"The Lone Cyborg"; Transliteration: "Kokō no Saibōgu" (Japanese: 孤高のサイボーグ)	Shinichirō Ushijima	Shingo Natsume	Keisuke Kojima	October 12, 2015	July 24, 2016
3	3	"The Obsessive Scientist"; Transliteration: "Shūnen no Kagakusha" (Japanese: 執念の科学者)	Yōsuke Hatta	Shingo Natsume & Yōsuke Hatta	Shōsuke Ishibashi	October 19, 2015	July 31, 2016
4	4	"The Modern Ninja"; Transliteration: "Imadoki no Ninja" (Japanese: 今時の忍者)	Nobuhiro Mutō	Katsunori Shibata & Shinichirō Ushijima	Se Jun Kim	October 26, 2015	August 7, 2016
5	5	"The Ultimate Master"; Transliteration: "Kyūkyoku no Shi" (Japanese: 究極の師)	Shunichi Yoshizawa	Shunichi Yoshizawa	Seung Cheol Ryu & Hidehiko Sawada	November 2, 2015	August 14, 2016
6	6	"The Terrifying City"; Transliteration: "Saikyō no Toshi" (Japanese: 最恐の都市)	Shinichirō Ushijima	Shinichirō Ushijima	Keisuke Kojima	November 9, 2015	August 21, 2016
7	7	"The Ultimate Disciple"; Transliteration: "Shikō no Deshi" (Japanese: 至高の弟子)	Yōsuke Hatta	Yōsuke Hatta	Shōsuke Ishibashi & Seung Cheol Ryu	November 16, 2015	August 28, 2016
8	8	"The Deep Sea King"; Transliteration: "Shinkai no Ō" (Japanese: 深海の王)	Nobuhiro Mutō	Yoshiaki Kawajiri	Minami Yoshida & Kōji Ōdate	November 23, 2015	September 11, 2016 (Note: On the broadcast night of September 3–4, 2016, Adult Swim hosted a One-Punch Man Labor Day marathon where they played the first seven episodes.)
9	9	"Unyielding Justice"; Transliteration: "Fukutsu no Seigi" (Japanese: 不屈の正義)	Shunichi Yoshizawa	Yoshiaki Kawajiri	Yoshimichi Kameda	November 30, 2015	September 18, 2016
10	10	"Unparalleled Peril"; Transliteration: "Katsute nai Hodo no Kiki" (Japanese: かつてない程の危機)	Shinichirō Ushijima	Yoshiaki Kawajiri	Keisuke Kojima & Seung Cheol Ryu	December 7, 2015	September 25, 2016
11	11	"The Dominator of the Universe"; Transliteration: "Zen Uchū no Hasha" (Japanese: 全宇宙の覇者)	Yōsuke Hatta	Yoshiaki Kawajiri	Se Jun Kim & Shōsuke Ishibashi	December 14, 2015	October 2, 2016
12	12	"The Strongest Hero"; Transliteration: "Saikyō no Hīrō" (Japanese: 最強のヒーロー)	Shingo Natsume	Shingo Natsume	Chikashi Kubota	December 21, 2015	October 9, 2016

=== Season 2 (2019) ===
No. overall	No. in season	Title	Directed by	Written by	Storyboarded by	Original release date (Note: TV Tokyo lists the season premiere as airing on April 9 at 25:35, which is effectively April 10 at 1:35 a.m. JST.)	English air date
13	1	"Return of the Hero"; Transliteration: "Hīrō no Kikan" (Japanese: ヒーローの帰還)	Shūji Miyazaki	Tomohiro Suzuki	Chikara Sakurai	April 10, 2019	October 12, 2019
14	2	"The Human Monster"; Transliteration: "Ningen no Kaijin" (Japanese: 人間の怪人)	Hiroyuki Okuno	Tomohiro Suzuki	Chikara Sakurai & Kazuo Takigawa	April 17, 2019	October 19, 2019
15	3	"The Hunt Begins"; Transliteration: "Kari no Hajimari" (Japanese: 狩りの始まり)	Ryo Ando	Tatsurō Inamoto	Ryo Ando	April 24, 2019	October 26, 2019
16	4	"The Metal Bat"; Transliteration: "Kinzoku no Batto" (Japanese: 金属のバット)	Riki Fukushima, Miyuki Ishida & Makoto Sokuza	Tatsurō Inamoto	Chikara Sakurai	May 1, 2019	November 2, 2019
17	5	"The Martial Arts Tournament"; Transliteration: "Bujutsu no Taikai" (Japanese: 武術の大会)	Tomohiro Kamitani & Kouzou Kaihou	Tomohiro Suzuki	Chikara Sakurai & Masao Ōkubo	May 8, 2019	November 9, 2019
18	6	"The Monster Uprising"; Transliteration: "Kaijin no Hōki" (Japanese: 怪人の蜂起)	Hideki Okamoto	Tomohiro Suzuki	Kōichi Takada	May 15, 2019	November 16, 2019
19	7	"The Class S Heroes"; Transliteration: "Esu-Kyū no Hīrō" (Japanese: S級のヒーロー)	Shigeki Awai	Tatsurō Inamoto	Takashi Watanabe	May 22, 2019	November 23, 2019
20	8	"The Resistance of the Strong"; Transliteration: "Tsuyoi Yatsu no Teikō" (Japanese: 強い奴の抵抗)	Yoshio Suzuki	Tatsurō Inamoto	Chikara Sakurai & Kōichi Takada	May 29, 2019	November 30, 2019
21	9	"The Troubles of the Strongest"; Transliteration: "Saikyō no Nayami" (Japanese: 最強の悩み)	Shūji Miyazaki	Tomohiro Suzuki	Joji Furuta	June 12, 2019 (Note: Broadcast of episode 21 was postponed by one week due to TV Tokyo's broadcast of the 2019 French Open.)	December 7, 2019
22	10	"Justice Under Siege"; Transliteration: "Seigi no Hōimō" (Japanese: 正義の包囲網)	Ryo Ando	Tomohiro Suzuki	Ryo Ando	June 19, 2019	December 14, 2019
23	11	"The Varieties of Pride"; Transliteration: "Sorezore no Kyōji" (Japanese: それぞれの矜持)	Katsushi Sakurabi & Chikara Sakurai	Tatsurō Inamoto	Miyana Okita	June 26, 2019	January 5, 2020 (Note: Adult Swim moved One-Punch Man from 11:30 p.m. to 12 a.m. EST/PST, making the dates of the remaining episodes of season 2 effectively Sunday.)
24	12	"The Wiping of the Disciple's Butt"; Transliteration: "Deshi no Shirinugui" (Japanese: 弟子の尻拭い)	Makoto Sokuza, Yōhei Suzuki & Chikara Sakurai	Tomohiro Suzuki	Chikara Sakurai	July 3, 2019	January 12, 2020

=== Season 3 (2025) ===
No. overall	No. in season	Title	Directed by	Storyboarded by	Chief animation directed by	Original release date
Part 1
25	1	"Strategy Meeting"; Transliteration: "Sakusen no Kaigi" (Japanese: 作戦の会議)	Miyuki Ishida	Shinpei Nagai	Kazumi Ono	October 12, 2025
26	2	"Monster Traits"; Transliteration: "Kaijin no Jōken" (Japanese: 怪人の条件)	Ei Tanaka	Shinpei Nagai	Kazumi Ono	October 19, 2025
27	3	"Organism Limits"; Transliteration: "Seibutsu no Genkai" (Japanese: 生物の限界)	Masahito Otani & Shūji Miyazaki	Shinpei Nagai	Kazumi Ono	October 26, 2025
28	4	"Counterattack Signal"; Transliteration: "Hangeki no Noroshi" (Japanese: 反撃の狼煙)	Nana Fujiwara	Shinpei Nagai	Shinya Hasegawa	November 2, 2025
29	5	"Monster King"; Transliteration: "Kaijin no Ō" (Japanese: 怪人の王)	Makoto Sokuza	Shinpei Nagai	Shinya Hasegawa	November 9, 2025
30	6	"Motley Heroes"; Transliteration: "Fuzoroi no Hīrō-tachi" (Japanese: 不揃いのヒーローたち)	Taiki Nishimura	Shinpei Nagai	Kazumi Ono	November 16, 2025
31	7	"Counterstrike"; Transliteration: "Go no Sen" (Japanese: 後の先)	Shūji Miyazaki	Omar Vallejos & Shinpei Nagai	Shinya Hasegawa	November 23, 2025
32	8	"Ninja Tale"; Transliteration: "Shinobi no Maki" (Japanese: 忍の巻)	Tetsuro Tanaka, Shinpei Nagai & Miyuki Ishida	Shinpei Nagai	Shinya Hasegawa & Kazumi Ono	November 30, 2025
33	9	"Brave Child"; Transliteration: "Warabe no Yū" (Japanese: 童の勇)	Kouzou Kaihou	Takashi Hashimoto	Shinya Hasegawa	December 8, 2025 (Note: Due to TV Tokyo's extended coverage of the 2025 ITTF Mixed Team World Cup, episode 33 aired 30 minutes after the regular air time at 12:15 a.m. JST.)
34	10	"Immortal Bloodbath"; Transliteration: "Fujimi no Dorojiai" (Japanese: 不死身の泥仕合)	Nana Fujiwara & Masahito Otani	Shinpei Nagai	Shinya Hasegawa	December 14, 2025
35	11	"Top Dragons"; Transliteration: "Ryū no Kanbu" (Japanese: 竜の幹部)	Miyuki Ishida	Shinpei Nagai	Shinya Hasegawa	December 22, 2025 (Note: Due to special network programming, episode 35 aired 40 minutes after the regular air time at 12:25 a.m. JST.)
36	12	"Ultimate Lifeform"; Transliteration: "Kyūkyoku no Seimeitai" (Japanese: 究極の生命体)	Nana Fujiwara & Yoshiyuki Nogami	Shinpei Nagai	Shinya Hasegawa & Kazumi Ono	December 29, 2025 (Note: Due to special network programming, episode 36 aired 1 hour and 15 minutes after the regular air time at 1:00 a.m. JST.)

== OVAs ==
No.	Title	Directed by	Written by	Storyboarded by	Original release date	English release date
0	"Road to Hero"; Transliteration: "Rōdo tu Hīrō" (Japanese: ロード・トゥ・ヒーロー)	Minoru Yamaoka	Tomohiro Suzuki	Yuzuru Tachikawa	December 4, 2015 (Note: Road to Hero is an original animation DVD (OAD) that's bundled with the special edition 10th manga volume ISBN 978-4-08-908260-7)	N/A
During his first year of training, Saitama (who still has hair, and is wearing a blue track suit) has defeated numerous villains in the abandoned area in Z-City, but is still having problems with paying the rent. Saitama speaks with his go-to tailor who is being forced to surrender his store's deed by a local gang. Several other shops have gone out of business, and the tailor's shop is the last one left. The gang's base is part of Saitama's apartment complex, where he goes door to door meeting the various criminals in the gang. Saitama isn't interested in them until he hears them mention the reward on their heads. Saitama tells the leader of the gang that he has been taking down shops by overcharging the owners & asks for the deed of the tailor's shop back. The leader of the gang loses it and transforms into the villain known as (the) Goldfish of Darkness. After Goldfish of Darkness reveals that the reward on his head is the biggest out of the entire gang, Saitama defeats him easily. He calls the police on the criminals living in the apartment complex & informs the landlady, in order to get the reward money to pay the rent. She kicks him out because she already knew that her other tenants were in the gang. Saitama gives the tailor his deed back, but the tailor tells him that he's retiring anyway. He gives Saitama his final piece of work (Saitama's costume). In present day, after hearing all this, Genos tells Saitama that he should get a better suit. But Saitama declines, saying all he explained was that the suit is a memento.
One-Punch Man Season 1 OVAs
1	"The Shadow That Snuck Up Too Close"; Transliteration: "Shinobiyori-sugiru Kage" (Japanese: 忍び寄りすぎる影)	Nobuhiro Mutō	Tomohiro Suzuki	Nobuhiro Mutō	December 24, 2015	April 25, 2017
After the battle with Mosquito Girl, Genos tails Saitama as he goes about his daily life in the hopes of finding out the secrets behind his overwhelming strength. This in turn leads Saitama to believe he has a stalker after Genos takes one of his french fries for research. Saitama soon comes across Men's Esthetician Man, believing him to be the stalker and knocking him out. After his research goes nowhere, Genos decides to confront Saitama about his apprenticeship offer.
2	"The Pupil Who Is an Extremely Poor Talker"; Transliteration: "Hanashibeta-sugiru Deshi" (Japanese: 話ベタすぎる弟子)	Nobuhiro Mutō	Tomohiro Suzuki	Nobuhiro Mutō	January 28, 2016	April 25, 2017
After spending some time together in a communal bath, Saitama gives Genos a key to their apartment and they both mull over items to buy for dinner; however, upon remembering a limited time sale at two separate supermarkets, the pair split up. Genos then senses a monster at a nearby shopping strip and defeats it. However, this makes him miss one of the sales. Once he reaches the other (closed down) supermarket, Genos bumps into the Dai Fuu Family's No. 2 man and the rival C-Class Pacino Family, headed by Don Pacino. Pacino mistakenly believes Genos is associated with the Dai Fuu Family; he steals the apartment key and kidnaps both men, promising to let them and the keys go once Genos states his case. Once Genos finishes telling his roundabout and ultimately worthless story to the Pacino family, Don Pacino becomes angry with Genos and the family opens fire. Genos easily defeats them and takes his key and the Dai Fuu Family's No. 2 man with him. After explaining his tardiness to Saitama, the pair enjoy some sukiyaki.
3	"The Ninja Who Is Too Complicated"; Transliteration: "Kojire-sugiru Ninja" (Japanese: こじれすぎる忍者)	Akitsugu Hisagi	Tomohiro Suzuki	Akitsugu Hisagi	February 25, 2016	April 25, 2017
After the events of episode 4, Sonic finds himself troubled that he cannot fight properly after his defeat at the hands of Saitama. While training in a forest with a Matagi who is looking to kill a bear that scarred him, Sonic rescues a baby boar from a snake that quickly bonds with him. Naming the boar Ino, Sonic continues training, gradually regains his confidence, and eventually leaves the Matagi and Ino, ready to fight Saitama again. Suddenly, the bear who scarred the Matagi (whose name is Frank) appears, only for Saitama to show up (he had previously heard of an influx of bears in the forest, and was hoping to have bear meat for dinner). Sonic silently watches over the city, ready for his next battle with Saitama, while Frank and Ino look with amazement at the forest cleared with a single punch.
4	"Bang, Who Is Too Overbearing"; Transliteration: "Gōin-sugiru Bang" (Japanese: 強引すぎるバング)	Akitsugu Hisagi	Tomohiro Suzuki	Akitsugu Hisagi	March 29, 2016	April 25, 2017
After the events of episode 7, Bang begins to spy on Saitama and Genos to gauge their abilities. Hopeful that his Water Stream Rock Smashing Fist martial arts is stronger, and that proving so will coerce Saitama and Genos to study under him, Bang invites Saitama and Genos to his dojo under the pretense of giving them free meat. Soon, Bang challenges Saitama to a variety of games, including card-based memory games and rock-paper-scissors, with Bang winning almost every time. During one rock-paper-scissors match, an enraged Saitama nearly crushes Bang with a hammer, who is then forced to admit that Saitama is truly powerful. He does note, however, that the rock-paper-scissors game was the most excited he had ever seen Saitama be, and offers Saitama to join his dojo. Saitama refuses.
5	"The Sisters Who Have Too Many Things Happening"; Transliteration: "Iroiro Ari-sugiru Shimai" (Japanese: 色々ありすぎる姉妹)	Yōsuke Hatta	Tomohiro Suzuki	Yoshiharu Ashino	April 23, 2016	April 25, 2017
After Fubuki and the Blizzard Group get rid of one of Deep Sea King's leftover henchman, they are disheartened to learn that their heroism didn't make the next day's newspaper but everyone else's (including Tatsumaki) did. Fubuki takes this the hardest, and decides to go on a train ride to City Z to clear her thoughts. Genos, coincidentally, happens to also be on the same train with groceries. Later during the ride, Genos receives a call that an ex-Hero planted a bomb on the train and that it will detonate once it reaches the train station. Fubuki evacuates the panicked civilians off the train while enlisting the help of a budding, C-class hero to find the bomb; Genos tries to slow down the train from the outside. As Fubuki evacuates the C-class hero and hesitates while thinking about what to do with the bomb, Tatsumaki appears and successfully allows the train to detonate with no casualties; Fubuki once again expresses envy towards her older sister's actions. On the walk back, Fubuki meets up with the C-class hero, who expresses gratitude for Fubuki's actions and wishes to join Fubuki's group once she reaches B-class. Genos, meanwhile, visits Dr. Kuseno asking for psychic augmentation. The OVA ends with Saitama wondering why Genos is so late.
6	"The Murder Case That Is Too Impossible"; Transliteration: "Fukanō-sugiru Satsujin Jiken" (Japanese: 不可能すぎる殺人事件)	Yōsuke Hatta	Tomohiro Suzuki	Yoshiharu Ashino	May 31, 2016	April 25, 2017
The episode starts at the Hero Association's hot spring resort with the heroes who participated in the largest alien invasion had found Zombieman murdered on the floor. Child Emperor states that one of the S-Class heroes is the culprit. The scene then flashbacks to the day before the murder had happened where all heroes were invited to stay overnight at the resort. The heroes enjoyed themselves in the hot spring. Metal Bat wasn't satisfied that some of the heroes that did not participate in the battle (Flashy Flash, Pig God, Watchdog Man), got invited as well. After the hot spring, Sitch gathers all the heroes to celebrate the victory against the invasion. A few heroes became drunk after drinking sake, which disgusted Child Emperor. The scene then returns to the murder, where Child Emperor gathers some of the evidence and tries to eliminate possible suspects to find out the truth. One of them being the weapon which stabbed Zombieman (Atomic Samurai's sword). He then interrogates a few other heroes including Saitama who asked Zombieman if he is truly immortal and finally asked King for more information. King recounts his story and shows a menacing face which scared Child Emperor a bit. Suddenly, Tatsumaki appears and is about to restrain everyone for being suspects of the murder when Zombieman wakes up. He then reveals that Atomic Samurai's katana was floating with green light surrounding it similar to Tatsumaki when she is flying. Child Emperor then asks Tatsumaki her whereabouts of the previous night. She angrily argues that she knew Zombieman cannot be killed and wouldn't do such a half-assed thing. Later, Sitch then asked Child Emperor to look at a surveillance camera footage of last night. It shows that Tatsumaki is the culprit and she was very drunk. When walking home, Saitama was wondering why Tatsumaki would stab Zombieman. It was revealed that Saitama told Tatsumaki that she is a child and shouldn't drink sake. Feeling humiliated, Tatsumaki drank as much as she could.
One-Punch Man Season 2 OVAs
1	"Saitama and the Mediocre Ability Users"; Transliteration: "Saitama to Sokosoko no Nōryokumono-tachi" (Japanese: サイタマとそこそこの能力者達)	Kōzō Taihō	Tatsurō Inamoto	Kōichi Takada	October 25, 2019	November 10, 2020
Saitama meets a group of villains in a public restroom who mistake him for their ally, they introduce themselves to Saitama, but when he reveals he's a hero, attempt to defeat him. Their attacks misfire and they end up getting saved by Saitama, and start contemplating about how weak their abilities are compared to the likes of Tatsumaki and Volten, who use their respective abilities to earn a living. They have a change of heart, but the group is then attacked by Dirt Earthworm and saved by Saitama again, who sends the monster flying. Genos arrives at the scene after following the evacuation warning only to find Saitama there alone with The Mediocre Ability Users, who he thinks are troubling his master. They quickly lie about how they just aspire to be heroes and wanted to spar with Saitama, who believes them and decides to train them. Dirt Earthworm observes from afar, and is about to leave the area but is eaten by a random bird.
2	"Going Fishing with Middle-Aged Men"; Transliteration: "Ossan-tachi to Tsuri" (Japanese: おっさん達と釣り)	Ei Tanaka	Tatsurō Inamoto	Miyana Okita	November 26, 2019	November 10, 2020
A week after the events of season 1 finale, Atomic Samurai and Bang go out fishing on a lake. Giant Salamander attacks the lake and Chain'n'toad and Mumen Rider try to stop it but fail, and Chain'n'toad is eaten. They are then saved by Atomic Samurai who kills the monster. Kamikaze and Bang talk about how most young heroes these days don't live to the essence of a "hero", and Bang states the Hero Association and their ranking system is partly to blame.
3	"Genos and Memory Loss"; Transliteration: "Genos to Kioku Sōshitsu" (Japanese: ジェノスと記憶喪失)	Kōzō Taihō	Tomohiro Suzuki	Chikara Sakurai	December 25, 2019	November 10, 2020
While opening a bag of chips, Saitama accidentally smacks Genos on the face, which causes the latter to lose his memory. Genos becomes cocky, childish & arrogant; and even flirts with Fubuki when she comes over. Fubuki sees this as an opportunity to make Genos Join her group. She lures him into a warehouse & says he's already a member of the group, but Genos flies away in disbelief. Lord of Mountains attacks the city and everyone turns to Genos to save the day, who lures the monster into the same warehouse, unsure of himself. During the battle, Genos gets hit on the same area of his face & regains his memory.
4	"Game and Rivals"; Transliteration: "Gēmu to Raibaru-tachi" (Japanese: ゲームとライバル達)	Miyuki Ishida	Tatsurō Inamoto	Hideki Okamoto	January 28, 2020	November 10, 2020
At a video game tournament where there is a prize, Suiryu, King, Saitama And Garou Join the tournament, with them picking between playing with a controller or VR (Virtual Reality) system that follows their movements. Everyone picks VR except for King. Suiryu And Garou fights and Garou lags because his movements were too fast to comprehend. King ends up as the winner of the video game tournament.
5	"Puri-Puri Prisoner and the Jailbreaking Prisoners"; Transliteration: "Puri-Puri Purizunā to Datsugoku Shūjin-tachi" (Japanese: ぷりぷりプリズナーと脱獄囚人達)	Miyuki Ishida	Tomohiro Suzuki	Chikara Sakurai & Kyōhei Suzuki	February 27, 2020	November 10, 2020
Puri-Puri Prisoner defeats a monster and damages his prison's security system in the process, allowing a handful of inmates to escape the facility. Realizing that the incident may cost a warden he find to be cute his job, Puri-Puri Prisoner heads out to find and retrieve the escaped inmates. While trying to recapture the escaped inmates, he is confronted and attacked by Urn Eel, a Seafolk who ate some of the prisoners who happened to be hiding in the same abandoned building as him.
6	"Zombieman Murder Case 2: A Chalet Amid the Blizzard, and the Ones Bothered by the Cold"; Transliteration: "Zonbiman Satsujin Jiken Ni ~Fubuki no Sansō to Samugari-tachi~" (Japanese: ゾンビマン殺人事件2 〜吹雪の山荘と寒がり達〜)	Kōzō Taihō	Tatsurō Inamoto	Chikara Sakurai	March 27, 2020	November 10, 2020
Child Emperor, Zombieman, Superalloy Darkshine, and Metal Bat are dispatched to a snowy mountain range to hunt a monster. After failing to locate the monster in during a snowstorm, they check into a local lodge for the night. There they encounter Saitama and Genos, who also got stuck on the mountain and had to check in, and Flashy Flash, who is trying to relax on a vacation. Overnight, Zombieman is attacked and his room is destroyed. Because he is unconscious, the others can only assume its the work of the monster and try to locate it before it can cause more harm.
