= One-Punch Man season 2 =

Second season of the One-Punch Man anime television series

One-Punch Man
- Season 2
- Japanese cover art for the first home media volume of the season
- No. of episodes: 12

Release
- Original network: TV Tokyo
- Original release: April 10 – July 3, 2019

Season chronology
- ← Previous; Season 1 Next → Season 3

The second season of the One-Punch Man anime television series is based on the webcomic of the same name written by One and its subsequent manga remake illustrated by Yusuke Murata. The season is animated by J.C. Staff, with Chikara Sakurai replacing Shingo Natsume as series director and Yoshikazu Iwanami replacing Shoji Hata as sound director. Tomohiro Suzuki, Chikashi Kubota and Makoto Miyazaki reprised their roles as series composer, character designer and music composer, respectively. The second season aired between April 10 and July 3, 2019, with a recap special covering the first season having aired a week before broadcast on April 3, 2019. The second season was simulcast on Hulu in the United States, on Tubi in Canada, on AnimeLab in Australia and New Zealand, and on Crunchyroll in Europe. The season aired on Adult Swim's Toonami block from October 12, 2019, to January 12, 2020.

The opening theme song is "Uncrowned Greatest Hero" (静寂のアポストル, Seijaku no Aposutoru; lit. 'Quiet Apostle'), performed by JAM Project, while the ending theme song is "Chizu ga Nakutemo Modoru kara" (地図が無くても戻るから; lit. 'Even Without a Map, I'll Return'), performed by Makoto Furukawa.

== Episodes ==
| No. overall | No. in season | Title | Directed by | Written by | Storyboarded by | Original release date (Note: TV Tokyo lists the season premiere as airing on April 9 at 25:35, which is effectively April 10 at 1:35 a.m. JST.) | English air date |
|---|---|---|---|---|---|---|---|
| 13 | 1 | "Return of the Hero"; Transliteration: "Hīrō no Kikan" (Japanese: ヒーローの帰還) | Shūji Miyazaki | Tomohiro Suzuki | Chikara Sakurai | April 10, 2019 | October 12, 2019 |
Saitama and Genos are returning from the grocery store when they see King, S Class Hero Rank 7. King isn't actually the strongest man alive but an ordinary otaku who happened to be at the place where strong monsters were eliminated and given credit for defeating them. He is running from an enemy but Saitama rescues him. King realizes that Saitama had saved him in the past after saving him from being attacked yet again. Afterwards, Saitama plays video games with King while Genos gets upgrades from G4's equipment after defeating the robot. The President of the Hero Association announces that he will be hiring villains; Speed O' Sound Sonic leaves the meeting after discovering Saitama was not present. A man named Garou interrupts the meeting.
| 14 | 2 | "The Human Monster"; Transliteration: "Ningen no Kaijin" (Japanese: 人間の怪人) | Hiroyuki Okuno | Tomohiro Suzuki | Chikara Sakurai & Kazuo Takigawa | April 17, 2019 | October 19, 2019 |
At the Hero Association meeting, Garou mocks both heroes and villains, declaring himself a monster and everyone his enemy. He brutally beats all present except Sitch to send a message. Meanwhile, Saitama relaxes at home playing King's stolen PSP, while Genos does chores. Speed-o'-Sound Sonic arrives searching for Saitama, leading to a fierce clash with Genos. Elsewhere, Fubuki, aka Hellish Blizzard, approaches Saitama, hoping to recruit him into her faction. When persuasion fails, she orders her followers to attack, but Saitama effortlessly defeats them. Using psychic powers to no avail, she's scolded by Saitama for relying on weak underlings and warned that factions are meaningless against true threats. Fubuki ignores him and attacks again, only for Saitama to save her from collateral damage in Genos and Sonic's duel. Their fight ends in stalemate until Saitama intervenes, preventing Genos's explosion and outpacing Sonic's shadow clone technique with Serious Series: Sideways Jumps. Sonic is overwhelmed and defeated, leaving Fubuki stunned by Saitama's power. Later, Fubuki admits she lives in her sister Tatsumaki's shadow and cannot surpass Amai Mask, Class A Rank 1. Elsewhere, Amai Mask proves her point by brutally killing a monster. Elsewhere, Garou ambushes Tank Top Vegetarian.
| 15 | 3 | "The Hunt Begins"; Transliteration: "Kari no Hajimari" (Japanese: 狩りの始まり) | Ryo Ando | Tatsurō Inamoto | Ryo Ando | April 24, 2019 | October 26, 2019 |
Silver Fang expels his pupil Charanko, who seeks out Saitama and Genos for answers. With King and Fubuki also visiting, Genos deduces that Charanko was dismissed because Garou, Bang's former student, has resurfaced, and Bang is trying to keep his pupil safe. That night, Charanko stumbles upon Garou confronting Mumen Rider. Before a fight begins, Tank Top Vegetarian and his crew intervene, but Garou defeats them. Tank Top Master arrives, giving Garou his first S-Class opponent. Though Tank Top Master initially dominates, Mumen Rider takes a blow meant to kill. Garou feigns remorse but suddenly unleashes Bang's signature style, the Water Stream Rock Smashing Fist, defeating Tank Top Master, Rider, Charanko, and the Tank Top gang. Bang, realizing the threat, calls his brother Bomb for help. The brothers discover the group's battered bodies. Saitama visits Mumen Rider in the hospital and hears about Garou's martial arts. Meanwhile, Garou encounters a boy named Tareo with a hero almanac and targets Golden Ball, defeating him. Curious about martial arts, Saitama accepts Charanko's tournament ticket and dons a disguise. When Garou mistakes him for an enemy, Saitama knocks him unconscious. In the post-credit scene, Genos proposes hair implants for Saitama's disguise, annoying him.
| 16 | 4 | "The Metal Bat"; Transliteration: "Kinzoku no Batto" (Japanese: 金属のバット) | Riki Fukushima, Miyuki Ishida & Makoto Sokuza | Tatsurō Inamoto | Chikara Sakurai | May 1, 2019 | November 2, 2019 |
As a child, Garou sympathized with monsters, believing they tried their hardest yet always lost simply for being "freaks". When told good guys always win, he vowed to become the ultimate monster and overturn that fate. In the present, Garou regains consciousness, with his memory hazy, and reunites with Tareo. Spotting Watchdog Man and Metal Bat, he sets his sights on them. Meanwhile, Saitama signs up for the fighting tournament using Charanko's entry. Reviewing contestants, he meets Sour Face, a former disciple of Bang. Sour Face seeks fame through victory and recalls that six months earlier Garou rampaged through Bang's dojo, injuring students and prompting Bang to expel him. Sour Face quit afterward. When Sour Face mocks "Charanko", Saitama retorts that at least Charanko fought Garou directly, angering him further. Elsewhere, the Hero Association assigns S-Class heroes to protect VIPs. King escapes duty by pretending to battle a secret boss while actually gaming. Metal Bat is tasked with guarding Narinki and his son Waganma at a restaurant. After defeating several monsters, he faces Elder Centipede, a Dragon-level threat. During the battle, he collides with Garou, sparking a fierce fight. In the post-credit scene, martial artist Suiryu heads toward the tournament.
| 17 | 5 | "The Martial Arts Tournament"; Transliteration: "Bujutsu no Taikai" (Japanese: 武術の大会) | Tomohiro Kamitani & Kouzou Kaihou | Tomohiro Suzuki | Chikara Sakurai & Masao Ōkubo | May 8, 2019 | November 9, 2019 |
Metal Knight confronts Elder Centipede but fails to do any damage. Meanwhile, Garou defeats Metal Bat after a grueling fight, though he begrudgingly admits Metal Bat could have won with a single solid strike. When Metal Bat rises again to attack, his younger sister Zenko intervenes, forcing him to stop. Garou also relents, unwilling to harm a child, and leaves to seek Watchdog Man. Metal Bat collapses from accumulated injuries as Zenko prevents him from pursuing Elder Centipede. Elsewhere, C-Class heroes Pineapple and Mohican are easily beaten by Rhino Wrestler, leading to Waganma's capture. Phoenix Man and Sludge Jellyfish approach Garou, inviting him to join the Monster Association. Garou refuses, but Phoenix Man hints they will meet again and orders the monsters, including Elder Centipede, to retreat. Bang and Bomb continue their search for Garou, with Bang venting his frustration by killing a Demon-level foe. Across the cities, monsters such as Marshall Gorilla, Do-S, and Pure-Blood launch widespread attacks. Fubuki intervenes to halt Do-S before she can kill a hero with her mind-controlled followers. At the martial arts tournament, Saitama meets fighters including Suiryu, Bakuzan, and Zakkos. Saitama defeats Zakkos with one slap and Suiryu grows eager to face him.
| 18 | 6 | "The Monster Uprising"; Transliteration: "Kaijin no Hōki" (Japanese: 怪人の蜂起) | Hideki Okamoto | Tomohiro Suzuki | Kōichi Takada | May 15, 2019 | November 16, 2019 |
Lightning Max is defeated by Suiryu, while Genos receives reports of monsters swarming near the tournament. Snakebite Snek wins his match against Benpatsu, but the announcers' plan to evacuate is stalled when Bakuzan insists it will ruin the event. Sourface beats Jakuman and eagerly reports his victory to "Charanko", unaware that the disguised Saitama is absent. In his own match, Saitama faces Bakuzan, who arrogantly boasts about humiliating him. However, when Bakuzan mocks his hair, Saitama knocks him out with a single punch, impressing Suiryu. Outside the arena, Genos wipes out waves of monsters but struggles against the Demon-level Awakened Cockroach, who narrowly escapes. Distracted, Genos is ambushed by a powerful foe. Elsewhere, Hero Association members discover Pineapple and Mohican, and learn that Waganma has been captured. Meanwhile, Do-S brainwashes Fubuki's followers. Do-S claims she is provoking Fubuki to lure in Tatsumaki, who promptly arrives. Tatsumaki easily defeats her and the controlled henchmen and warns her sister that dependence on allies leads to weakness before flying off. Back at the tournament, Suiryu swiftly dispatches Sneck, musing that only the truly strong endure. In the post-credit scene, Garou encounters Watchdog Man, while Gouketsu, the Dragon-level monster who bested Genos, is revealed.
| 19 | 7 | "The Class S Heroes"; Transliteration: "Esu-Kyū no Hīrō" (Japanese: S級のヒーロー) | Shigeki Awai | Tatsurō Inamoto | Takashi Watanabe | May 22, 2019 | November 23, 2019 |
Child Emperor deploys his robot Underdog Man to analyze Eyesight's poison, but detonating it fails to kill the monster when she hardens her skin. Before she can finish him, Pig God intervenes and devours her, continuing his hunt for monsters in Y-City. Meanwhile, Garou sets his sights on Watchdog Man, only to be interrupted by another monster. Drive Knight interrogates a surviving creature for intel, while Death Gatling gathers heroes to battle Hundred Eyes Octopus. Flashy Flash cripples it with incredible speed, but Tatsumaki appears, instantly killing the monster and mocking Flash's lack of efficiency before flying off. Elsewhere, Amai Mask slaughters countless monsters, while Mumen Rider and Tank Top Master clear a hospital. Atomic Samurai meets with the Council of Swordsmasters, where Haragiri reveals allegiance to the Monster Association and attempts his betrayal attack, however Atomic Samurai swiftly kills him before leaving with his disciples to find the enemy's base. At the Super Fight Tournament, Saitama swiftly defeats both Sourface and Choze before clashing with Suiryu. Their duel highlights Suiryu's disdain for heroism and obsession with thrills, but Saitama effortlessly humiliates him, leaving Suiryu in stunned disbelief. In the post-credit scene, Genos awakens as a monster approaches the arena.
| 20 | 8 | "The Resistance of the Strong"; Transliteration: "Tsuyoi Yatsu no Teikō" (Japanese: 強い奴の抵抗) | Yoshio Suzuki | Tatsurō Inamoto | Chikara Sakurai & Kōichi Takada | May 29, 2019 | November 30, 2019 |
Suiryu is awarded the tournament trophy after Saitama's disqualification, but the celebration is cut short when the monster Gouketsu, revealed as a former martial arts champion transformed by Orochi's monster cells, arrives with his army. He distributes cells to the competitors, with Choze and others mutating into monsters. Suiryu defeats Choze and bravely rejects Gouketsu's offer, hurling the cell back. In retaliation, Gouketsu orders his monster crows to attack and personally brutalizes Suiryu. Amid the chaos, Bakuzan, envious of Suiryu, consumes three monster cells all at once. The physical strain of this action knocks him unconscious, allowing Lightning Max and Snek to rescue Suiryu and defeat the monster crows. However, Bakuzan quickly revives in full monstrous form, mercilessly battering Suiryu. As Suiryu lies broken, Gouketsu demonstrates his dominance by nearly killing Bakuzan with a single punch, warning them that stronger monsters exist. A message from Gyoro orders Gouketsu to retreat before S-Class heroes can arrive, leaving Bakuzan behind. Bakuzan boasts of his newfound strength, tormenting the helpless heroes. Suiryu, humiliated and desperate, pleads for rescue as Bakuzan prepares to crush Lightning Max and Snek. At the last moment, Saitama arrives and effortlessly saves them before stepping forward to confront Bakuzan.
| 21 | 9 | "The Troubles of the Strongest"; Transliteration: "Saikyō no Nayami" (Japanese: 最強の悩み) | Shūji Miyazaki | Tomohiro Suzuki | Joji Furuta | June 12, 2019 (Note: Broadcast of episode 21 was postponed by one week due to TV Tokyo's broadcast of the 2019 French Open.) | December 7, 2019 |
Bakuzan recognizes Saitama as his previous opponent but before he can make his next move, Saitama instantly kills him with a single punch. Introducing himself as a hero, Saitama explains to Suiryu that he entered the martial arts tournament to learn about Garou and experience martial arts. Though Suiryu begs him to stay, fearing Gouketsu, Saitama leaves, only for Gouketsu's severed head to crash down moments later. Saitama casually returns, asking Suiryu not to tell anyone, and when Suiryu asks if he can become a hero, Saitama says yes but refuses to take him as a disciple. Elsewhere, Puri Puri Prisoner kills the demon-level Free Hugger by crushing it, then learns that his cellmates were kidnapped. Meanwhile, Saitama faces an existential crisis, realizing martial arts and hero work still bore him. King comforts him, suggesting he strive to be the best hero. Though Saitama dismisses it as boring, his excitement reignites when King challenges him to a video game. Watchdog Man defeats Garou with his beastlike fighting style, frustrating but motivating the hunter. When Garou later confronts King, Saitama casually kicks him aside. Genos undergoes repairs, Sonic rejects monster cells by mistakenly cooking them, and Zombieman begins investigating Martial Gorilla.
| 22 | 10 | "Justice Under Siege"; Transliteration: "Seigi no Hōimō" (Japanese: 正義の包囲網) | Ryo Ando | Tomohiro Suzuki | Ryo Ando | June 19, 2019 | December 14, 2019 |
Saitama keeps losing to King in video games matches. During a break, Saitama notices King's phone, which he explains is for hero emergencies. Meanwhile, Gyoro-Gyoro and Destrochloridum manipulate a Hero Association executive, pretending to negotiate co-existence between humans and monsters. Destrochloridum then kills the executive, revealing the deception and declaring the monsters' true goal: a full-scale war against the Hero Association. Before attacking the remaining executives, Destrochloridum is stopped and killed by Superalloy Darkshine, who proves to be resistant against their manipulation. At the Monster Association, Gyoro and Orochi rally monsters for battle. Orochi devours Awakened Cockroach for losing against Genos, spares Do-S for her abilities, and learns of Gouketsu's demise. Word of the declaration of war spreads quickly, prompting unaffiliated monsters to attack humans, but Saitama annihilates them while complaining about being late for trash duty. Garou awakens from Saitama's kick and encounters A-Class hero Death Gatling before retreating to a shack. There, he meets Tareo again, telling the boy that strength prevents bullying. Soon, Death Gatling and his team: Stinger, Smile Man, Wildhorn, Chain Toad, Glasses, Gun Gun, and Shooter, corner Garou. Despite being poisoned and fighting a team of heroes alone, Garou resists fiercely and targets Glasses.
| 23 | 11 | "The Varieties of Pride"; Transliteration: "Sorezore no Kyōji" (Japanese: それぞれの矜持) | Katsushi Sakurabi & Chikara Sakurai | Tatsurō Inamoto | Miyana Okita | June 26, 2019 | January 5, 2020 (Note: Adult Swim moved One-Punch Man from 11:30 p.m. to 12 a.m. EST/PST, making the dates of the remaining episodes of season 2 effectively Sunday.) |
Death Gatling explains why he and other A-Class heroes targeted Garou: to prove that lower-ranked heroes, often overlooked in favor of the S-Class, also risk everything. The group attacks, but Garou systematically defeats Chain Toad, Shooter, Gun Gun, and Wildhorn. Cornered, Glasses recalls his past struggles in Fubuki's group and how Saitama once encouraged him to focus on progress instead of failure. Despite Glasses' resolve, Garou quickly defeats him and Stinger, leaving only Death Gatling left. Garou warns Death Gatling of a child hiding nearby, but the hero dismisses this and unleashes his ultimate attack, Death Shower. Demonstrating immense skill, Garou redirects every bullet, saving Tareo before defeating Death Gatling with disdainful words about pride. Terrified, Tareo flees after seeing the fallen heroes. Meanwhile, Saitama grows frustrated as King narrowly beats him in video games. When King's hero phone alerts them to Genos' location, they set out knowing Genos often ends up damaged. At the battlefield, Garou clashes with Genos. Though pinned and nearly killed, Garou escapes, proclaiming himself as the ultimate monster. Genos insists Saitama will always prevail. Before Garou can respond, Bang arrives, kicking him aside, while Bomb joins in, urging Genos to leave Garou's fate to them.
| 24 | 12 | "The Wiping of the Disciple's Butt"; Transliteration: "Deshi no Shirinugui" (Japanese: 弟子の尻拭い) | Makoto Sokuza, Yōhei Suzuki & Chikara Sakurai | Tomohiro Suzuki | Chikara Sakurai | July 3, 2019 | January 12, 2020 |
Silver Fang and Bomb relentlessly beat Garou up, who recalls childhood bullying from a classmate, Tat-Chan. This memory reveals Garou's hatred for heroes: he views them as glorified bullies who gang up on the weak, much like Tat-Chan did when labeling him a "monster". Fueled by this, Garou briefly repels Fang and Bomb before Phoenix Man intervenes to rescue him. Genos attempts to finish them off, but Phoenix Man summons Elder Centipede for aid. Fang and Bomb manage to wound the massive Dragon-level creature, yet Elder Centipede quickly regenerates and knocks them back. Genos steps in, hoping to stall the monster so Fang and Bomb can evacuate injured heroes. Though he deals some damage, Elder Centipede regenerates again and overwhelms him. Shaken by his failure, Genos despairs at his seeming worthlessness. Fang prepares to face Elder Centipede himself until King arrives, boldly bluffing with a megaphone that Blast, the top hero, is coming. As Elder Centipede charges to kill King, Saitama appears and obliterates it with a Serious Punch. In the aftermath, Genos asks what he lacks. Saitama replies, simply: "Power". Genos accepts this, determined to grow stronger. A post-credit scene shows Phoenix Man carrying the unconscious Garou to Orochi.

== Recap special ==
| No. overall | No. in season | Title | Original release date |
|---|---|---|---|
| 12.5 | 0 | "A Super Serious Look Back!"; Transliteration: "Maji Furikaeri!" (マジ振り返り！) | April 3, 2019 |
A second season commemorative special that serves as a recap of the first season
