= One-Punch Man season 3 =

Third season of the One-Punch Man anime television series

One-Punch Man
- Season 3
- Key visual for the season
- No. of episodes: 12

Release
- Original network: TV Tokyo
- Original release: October 12, 2025 – present

Season chronology
- ← Previous; Season 2

The third season of the One-Punch Man anime television series is based on the webcomic of the same name written by One and its subsequent manga remake illustrated by Yusuke Murata. A third season was announced in August 2022. Most of the main cast and staff from the second season are reprising their roles. The season is produced by J.C.Staff, with Shinpei Nagai replacing Chikara Sakurai as director, Sakura Murakami replacing both Shigemi Ikeda and Yukiko Maruyama as art director, and Yuki Hirose replacing Yoshio Ōkouchi as director of photography. The season's first cours aired from October 12 to December 29, 2025, with a recap special covering the second season airing a week before broadcast on October 5. A second cours was announced immediately following the conclusion of the first and is set to premiere in January 2027. The season is streaming on Hulu in the United States and Disney+ in Canada, and on Crunchyroll in Europe and Middle East.

The first opening theme song is "Get No Satisfied!", performed by JAM Project featuring Babymetal, while the first ending theme song is "Soko ni Aru Akari" (そこに有る灯り; lit. 'The Light, That's There'), performed by Makoto Furukawa. The second opening theme song is "Never Done: Supreme Power vs Ultimate Fear" (Never Done～最強VS最恐～, Never Done: Saikyō vs Saikyō), performed by JAM Project, while the second ending theme song is Wakusei no Katusumi (惑星の形, Wakusei no Katachi; lit. 'Corner of the Planet'), performed by Makoto Furukawa.

== Episodes ==
Note: All episodes that have aired thus far from this season have been written by Tomohiro Suzuki.

No. overall	No. in season	Title	Directed by	Storyboarded by	Chief animation directed by	Original release date
Part 1
25	1	"Strategy Meeting"; Transliteration: "Sakusen no Kaigi" (Japanese: 作戦の会議)	Miyuki Ishida	Shinpei Nagai	Kazumi Ono	October 12, 2025
The Hero Association convenes a high-stakes briefing to plan a rescue operation for Waganma, who was kidnapped by the Monster Association. Meanwhile, Garou recovers underground while Gyoro-Gyoro begins evaluating his potential as a monster threat.
26	2	"Monster Traits"; Transliteration: "Kaijin no Jōken" (Japanese: 怪人の条件)	Ei Tanaka	Shinpei Nagai	Kazumi Ono	October 19, 2025
Garou goes to a restaurant to eat, leading to a dine-and-dash situation that causes him to run directly into Saitama. Meanwhile, the Hero Association continues organizing its assault squad, ignoring lower-ranked proposals.
27	3	"Organism Limits"; Transliteration: "Seibutsu no Genkai" (Japanese: 生物の限界)	Masahito Otani & Shūji Miyazaki	Shinpei Nagai	Kazumi Ono	October 26, 2025
Garou attempts to protect young Tareo but runs into high-ranking Monster Association executives, Royal Ripper and Insect God. After a brutal beatdown, Garou is left critically injured while Tareo is taken captive.
28	4	"Counterattack Signal"; Transliteration: "Hangeki no Noroshi" (Japanese: 反撃の狼煙)	Nana Fujiwara	Shinpei Nagai	Shinya Hasegawa	November 2, 2025
Garou awakens, pushing past his human limits to storm the Monster Association headquarters and save Tareo. Meanwhile, the S-Class heroes gather at their staging area to launch their full-scale invasion.
29	5	"Monster King"; Transliteration: "Kaijin no Ō" (Japanese: 怪人の王)	Makoto Sokuza	Shinpei Nagai	Shinya Hasegawa	November 9, 2025
Garou fights through the underground base, eventually confronting the terrifying Monster King Orochi. Gyoro-Gyoro observes Garou's transformation, testing whether he can truly transcend into a Supreme Monster.
30	6	"Motley Heroes"; Transliteration: "Fuzoroi no Hīrō-tachi" (Japanese: 不揃いのヒーローたち)	Taiki Nishimura	Shinpei Nagai	Kazumi Ono	November 16, 2025
Internal tension rises among the S-Class heroes as Amai Mask crashes their strategy session, demanding leadership and questioning their resolve. The strike team finally makes entry into Z-City's underground lair.
31	7	"Counterstrike"; Transliteration: "Go no Sen" (Japanese: 後の先)	Shūji Miyazaki	Omar Vallejos & Shinpei Nagai	Shinya Hasegawa	November 23, 2025
The S-Class heroes breach the Monster Association base and split up into individual tunnels. Lower-ranked monsters try to swarm the intruders, but the heroes easily display their massive power gap.
32	8	"Ninja Tale"; Transliteration: "Shinobi no Maki" (Japanese: 忍の巻)	Tetsuro Tanaka, Shinpei Nagai & Miyuki Ishida	Shinpei Nagai	Shinya Hasegawa & Kazumi Ono	November 30, 2025
Flashy Flash faces off against speedsters Gale Wind and Hellfire Flame, two monsterized ninjas from his past who attempt to overwhelm him with coordinated, high-speed techniques.
33	9	"Brave Child"; Transliteration: "Warabe no Yū" (Japanese: 童の勇)	Kouzou Kaihou	Takashi Hashimoto	Shinya Hasegawa	December 8, 2025 (Note: Due to TV Tokyo's extended coverage of the 2025 ITTF Mixed Team World Cup, episode 33 aired 30 minutes after the regular air time at 12:15 a.m. JST.)
Child Emperor locates Waganma, but is intercepted by a revived Phoenix Man. forced to deploy his ultimate mech suit, Brave Giant, Child Emperor engages in an intense battle of attrition.
34	10	"Immortal Bloodbath"; Transliteration: "Fujimi no Dorojiai" (Japanese: 不死身の泥仕合)	Nana Fujiwara & Masahito Otani	Shinpei Nagai	Shinya Hasegawa	December 14, 2025
Child Emperor finishes his fight and secures Waganma. Meanwhile, Zombie Man navigates the dark depths of the base and encounters Pure Steel, initiating a grueling battle of endurance.
35	11	"Top Dragons"; Transliteration: "Ryū no Kanbu" (Japanese: 竜の幹部)	Miyuki Ishida	Shinpei Nagai	Shinya Hasegawa	December 22, 2025 (Note: Due to special network programming, episode 35 aired 40 minutes after the regular air time at 12:25 a.m. JST.)
The strike team encounters the Monster Association’s true powerhouses and the Dragon-level Executives. As several S-Class heroes find themselves outmatched, Child Emperor works to guide Waganma to the surface.
36	12	"Ultimate Lifeform"; Transliteration: "Kyūkyoku no Seimeitai" (Japanese: 究極の生命体)	Nana Fujiwara & Yoshiyuki Nogami	Shinpei Nagai	Shinya Hasegawa & Kazumi Ono	December 29, 2025 (Note: Due to special network programming, episode 36 aired 1 hour and 15 minutes after the regular air time at 1:00 a.m. JST.)
Tatsumaki initiates a psychic showdown against Gyoro-Gyoro. Below, Saitama, who wandered underground after following the noise—confronts Monster King Orochi and finishes the beast, while the larger war wages on.

== Recap special ==
No. overall	No. in season	Title	Original release date
24.5	0	"Get It All in One Punch!"; Transliteration: "Ichigeki de Wakaru!" (一撃でわかる！)	October 5, 2025
A third season commemorative special that serves as a recap of the second season

== Reception ==
The third season premiere received largely negative reviews from critics, describing it as a dialogue-heavy recap of the story thus far. Subsequent episodes have faced significant backlash from audiences due to what has been described as low-quality animation (a widely shared and ridiculed scene being referred to as "Garou Slide") with some even mockingly referring to the season as "One-Frame Man", "One-PNG Man" or "One Slideshow Man". In particular, the season has been criticized for using an abundance of panning static shots. For instance, the sixth episode featured a 20-second static image of a building's exterior (a brick wall and pipes) accompanied only by voice-over.

The intense criticism caused the season's director, Shinpei Nagai, to deactivate his social media accounts over online harassment. On IMDb, the sixth episode of the season, "Motley Heroes", received the worst user score for any anime in the site's history.
