= One-Punch Man season 1 =

First season of the One-Punch Man anime television series

One-Punch Man
- Season 1
- Japanese cover art for the first home media volume of the season
- No. of episodes: 12

Release
- Original network: TV Tokyo
- Original release: October 5 – December 21, 2015

Season chronology
- Next → Season 2

One-Punch Man is a Japanese anime television series based on the webcomic of the same name written by One and its subsequent manga remake illustrated by Yusuke Murata. The first season was directed by Shingo Natsume at Madhouse and written by Tomohiro Suzuki. The series also features character designs by Chikashi Kubota, who also served as chief animation director, and music composed by Makoto Miyazaki. The season aired from October 5 to December 21, 2015, and was simulcast outside Japan by Daisuki and Hulu. The English dub aired in the United States on Adult Swim's Toonami programming block from July 17 to October 9, 2016. (Note: Adult Swim lists the series premiere as airing on July 16 at 12:00 a.m. (24:00) EDT/PDT, which is effectively July 17.)

The opening theme song is "The Hero!! Ikareru Ken ni Honō o Tsukero" (THE HERO!! ～怒れる拳に火をつけろ～; lit. 'The Hero!! Set Fire to the Furious Fist'), performed by JAM Project, while the ending theme song is "Hoshi Yori Saki ni Mitsukete Ageru" (星より先に見つけてあげる; lit. 'I'll Find It Before the Stars for You'), performed by Hiroko Moriguchi. The ending theme song for episode 12 is "Kanashimi-tachi o Dakishimete" (悲しみたちを抱きしめて, lit. 'Hug Those Who Are Feeling Sad'), also performed by Hiroko Moriguchi.

== Episodes ==
Note: All episodes from this season were written by Tomohiro Suzuki.

No. overall	No. in season	Title	Directed by	Storyboarded by	Animation directed by	Original release date (Note: TV Tokyo lists the series premiere as airing on October 4 at 25:05, which is effectively October 5 at 1:05 a.m. JST.)	English air date
1	1	"The Strongest Man"; Transliteration: "Saikyō no Otoko" (Japanese: 最強の男)	Shingo Natsume	Shingo Natsume	Chikashi Kubota	October 5, 2015	July 17, 2016
A monster named Vaccine Man wreaks havoc in a city and is about to kill a young girl when a bald hero named Saitama intervenes and kills him with a single punch. Saitama recalls the events three years earlier that pushed him to become a hero; after saving a boy with a cleft-chin from Crablante, Saitama resolved to become a hero but became too powerful for his own satisfaction. Following taking out the Brain and Brawn Brothers, one of whom is a mutated giant, Saitama has a dream about a subterranean race who invades the Earth's surface and actually pose a challenge to him, rekindling a passion for battle he had been missing for years. However, when Saitama wakes up, he finds that the real Subterranean race is extremely weak. He kills their leader, and the rest immediately retreat.
2	2	"The Lone Cyborg"; Transliteration: "Kokō no Saibōgu" (Japanese: 孤高のサイボーグ)	Shinichirō Ushijima	Shingo Natsume	Keisuke Kojima	October 12, 2015	July 24, 2016
A cyborg named Genos tracks down a mutant called Mosquito Girl, whose mosquito swarm drains the blood out of everyone they come across within the city. Genos has a difficult time with Mosquito Girl who almost forces him to activate his self-destruct as a last resort to stop her. Saitama then suddenly stumbles into the fight, easily defeating Mosquito Girl. Genos tells Saitama how a mad cyborg destroyed his hometown and killed his family. Despite Genos's extremely boring explanation of his past, Saitama agrees to make Genos his apprentice. Soon after, Mosquito Girl's fellow mutants from the House of Evolution try to capture Saitama, with only Armored Gorilla surviving as he agrees to answer the heroes' questions.
3	3	"The Obsessive Scientist"; Transliteration: "Shūnen no Kagakusha" (Japanese: 執念の科学者)	Yōsuke Hatta	Shingo Natsume & Yōsuke Hatta	Shōsuke Ishibashi	October 19, 2015	July 31, 2016
Armored Gorilla tells the story of Doctor Genus, the House of Evolution's founding leader who wants to study Saitama's power to replicate it. Saitama and Genos reach the House of Evolution's base, forcing Genus to release his strongest creation: the unstable Carnage Kabuto. After Kabuto effortlessly defeats Genos, Saitama is eager to fight him, but Kabuto cowers upon sensing Saitama's limitless power. Saitama finally explains the secret to his strength-a simple workout regimen, much to Genos and Genus's astonishment. This infuriates Kabuto as he transforms into his berserk form, only to be killed when he unwittingly makes Saitama realize that he missed out on a big supermarket sale. Saitama and Genos rush to the sale while Dr. Genus abandons his research.
4	4	"The Modern Ninja"; Transliteration: "Imadoki no Ninja" (Japanese: 今時の忍者)	Nobuhiro Mutō	Katsunori Shibata & Shinichirō Ushijima	Se Jun Kim	October 26, 2015	August 7, 2016
The hard-headed criminal Hammerhead forms the Paradisers terrorist cell to demand free goods for the unemployed, targeting local business magnate Zeniru using stolen enhancement suits. While they easily defeat bicycle hero Mumen Rider, Hammerhead's men are taken out by Zeniru's hired ninja Speed-o'-Sound Sonic. Hammerhead flees after surviving a kunai stab to the back of his head, only to run into Saitama, who clarifies his lack of association with the Paradisers despite their shared baldness. Saitama easily defeats Hammerhead by destroying his suit, but lets him live and run away. Then Sonic, thinking Saitama was one of the Paradisers, attacks him, but is defeated after the ninja accidentally plants his crotch on Saitama's fist. The ninja quivers in agony and retreats, but not before declaring Saitama his eternal rival. That night, as Hammerhead turns over a new leaf after the owners of the stolen suits nearly killed him, Saitama sulks over his lack of recognition as a hero before Genos suggests they join the Hero Association.
5	5	"The Ultimate Master"; Transliteration: "Kyūkyoku no Shi" (Japanese: 究極の師)	Shunichi Yoshizawa	Shunichi Yoshizawa	Seung Cheol Ryu & Hidehiko Sawada	November 2, 2015	August 14, 2016
Saitama and Genos pass an exam for the Hero Association, with Genos placing in S-Class while Saitama ends up in C-Class by breaking every record in the physical portion of the exam but doing very poorly in the non-physical sections. They then attend an orientation seminar by Snakebite Snek, who is annoyed that Saitama does not pay attention to him. Snek tries to newbie crush Saitama, but is humbled when Saitama effortlessly defeats him. Having received new upgrades, Genos asks Saitama to spar with him and to do so seriously. Saitama humors him, but when he gets serious he completely outclasses Genos before he stops his finishing blow and calmly asks him to go get some food with him. A-Class Hero Amai Mask meets with Genos to deliver a welcome gift and a warning to take his responsibilities seriously. Genos moves in with Saitama, much to the latter's chagrin.
6	6	"The Terrifying City"; Transliteration: "Saikyō no Toshi" (Japanese: 最恐の都市)	Shinichirō Ushijima	Shinichirō Ushijima	Keisuke Kojima	November 9, 2015	August 21, 2016
Saitama tries to come up with ideas for mentoring Genos, then rushes off to find a villain once learning that C-class heroes get dropped off the registry after a week of inactivity. Sonic demands to settle their alleged rivalry, but Saitama refuses. Tank-Top Tiger reproaches Saitama for his antics and tries to steal credit when Sonic attacks him for interfering between him and Saitama's rivalry. Sonic then starts causing mayhem to force Saitama to fight him; Saitama indeed notices, and swiftly knocks him out with a tap on the back. Later that day, rumors of a monster skulking around the desolate Z-City reach the Hero Association. They send A-Class heroes Golden Ball and Spring Mustachio to investigate before they are taken out by the monster Kombu Infinity. While assumed to be the rumored monster, Kombu Infinity was actually attracted to Z-City by the rumor as well, but Saitama kills the monster and uses its remains for kombu soup. Sometime later, Genos informs Saitama that he is ranked 6th in popularity despite being in 17th place within the S-class, greatly annoying an envious Saitama.
7	7	"The Ultimate Disciple"; Transliteration: "Shikō no Deshi" (Japanese: 至高の弟子)	Yōsuke Hatta	Yōsuke Hatta	Shōsuke Ishibashi & Seung Cheol Ryu	November 16, 2015	August 28, 2016
Scientists discover a meteorite suddenly changing course toward City Z, prompting the Hero Association to deploy all S-Class heroes. Genos is the first to arrive, followed by veteran hero Bang, who warns that evacuations are underway and urges him to leave. Bang refuses to abandon the city, but before introducing himself further, Genos rushes into action. Soon, Metal Knight arrives, intent on testing his weapons rather than cooperating. His assault fails, and Genos' own prototype weapon, though stronger, also proves ineffective. At the last moment, Saitama appears and obliterates the meteor with a single punch. However, the meteor shatters into fragments that devastate the city, though miraculously no lives are lost. The following day, Saitama discovers his hero rank has skyrocketed from 342nd to 5th. Seeking more crises, he instead encounters Tanktop Tiger, who accuses him of stealing credit. His brother, Tank-Top Blackhole, incites a mob, blaming Saitama for the city's destruction. The brothers attack, but Saitama easily defeats them. He then silences the angry crowd, declaring he does not need recognition to be a hero, earning Genos' admiration. In the post-credits, unseen citizens discuss the meteor incident as ominous sea creatures begin gathering.
8	8	"The Deep Sea King"; Transliteration: "Shinkai no Ō" (Japanese: 深海の王)	Nobuhiro Mutō	Yoshiaki Kawajiri	Minami Yoshida & Kōji Ōdate	November 23, 2015	September 11, 2016 (Note: On the broadcast night of September 3–4, 2016, Adult Swim hosted a One-Punch Man Labor Day marathon where they played the first seven episodes.)
The Seafolk Tribe declare war on humanity. On his way home, Saitama casually kills an octopus-like monster, while Mumen Rider arrives too late, finding only the remains and hearing bystanders discuss Saitama. Curious, Mumen researches him online, discovering his strength but also the divided opinions surrounding him. At City J's coast, massive Sea-Folk emerge, prompting Class A hero Stinger (Rank 11) to challenge them with his Bamboo Shoot weapon. Though he defeats several foes, their leader the Deep Sea King appears and swiftly overwhelms him. Watching the report, Saitama sets out, joined by Genos and Mumen, with Genos scouting ahead. Other heroes attempt to stop Deep Sea King, including Lightning Max, Puri-Puri Prisoner, and Sonic. While Sonic holds his own, rain transforms Sea King into his true, monstrous form, forcing Sonic to retreat unclothed. On the road, Saitama and Mumen cross paths, but Saitama gets distracted after spotting Sonic streak past. Meanwhile, Sea King storms an emergency shelter, effortlessly defeating heroes such as All Back-Man, Bunbunman, Jet Nice Guy, and Sneck. When Mumen answers the Association's call to confront the threat, Saitama stumbles across a discarded cell phone. Turning serious, he declares to headquarters he is on his way.
9	9	"Unyielding Justice"; Transliteration: "Fukutsu no Seigi" (Japanese: 不屈の正義)	Shunichi Yoshizawa	Yoshiaki Kawajiri	Yoshimichi Kameda	November 30, 2015	September 18, 2016
Genos engages the Deep Sea King and initially overpowers him, but the monster tears his arm off. Genos urges civilians to flee before shielding a child from an acid attack, suffering severe damage. At that moment, Mumen Rider arrives. Though hopelessly outmatched, his determination inspires civilians. He repeatedly charges the Sea King, only to be beaten down brutally. Just before the final blow, Saitama arrives and catches him. After a brief exchange, Saitama defeats the Deep Sea King with one punch, clearing the skies and earning cheers from survivors. However, when a civilian insults the defeated heroes, Saitama deliberately downplays his role, claiming his victory was only easy because the others weakened the monster. By tarnishing his own reputation, he restores public faith in the heroes who fought bravely. Later, Saitama and Genos receive fan mail. Genos has many letters, while Saitama finds only one of hate and another of gratitude, alongside a notice that he has been promoted to B-Class, Rank 101. That evening, Saitama meets Mumen at a roadside oden stand, who reveals that he sent the positive letter and pays for Saitama's dinner. In the post-credits scene, fortune teller Madame Shibabawa warns that the Earth is doomed.
10	10	"Unparalleled Peril"; Transliteration: "Katsute nai Hodo no Kiki" (Japanese: かつてない程の危機)	Shinichirō Ushijima	Yoshiaki Kawajiri	Keisuke Kojima & Seung Cheol Ryu	December 7, 2015	September 25, 2016
The Ancient King of the Terror Lizard Clan appears but is instantly defeated by Tatsumaki. At his dojo, Bang tells Saitama and Genos about his rogue disciple, Garou, who defeated all of Bang's top students. Suddenly, a Hero Association messenger arrives, declaring an emergency and summoning all S-Class heroes. At headquarters, Saitama meets several S-Class heroes. Only Blast and Metal Knight are absent. Sitch, a staff member, announces that the great seer Madame Shibabawa has died during a prediction, leaving a finale note: that the Earth is in danger. Since her visions were always accurate, Sitch warns them to prepare for disaster within six months. Before the meeting ends, HQ is attacked by Skyfolk led by Sky King, who are quickly slain by Melzalgald, a member of the invading Dark Matter Thieves. Their massive spaceship annihilates City A, killing thousands. As Melzargard assaults civilians, Iaian of the Atomic Samurai's disciples intervenes but loses an arm before being saved by his master. Bang, Metal Bat, and Puri-Puri Prisoner join the fight, while other S-Class heroes debate strategies. Meanwhile, Saitama has already stormed the alien ship, slaughtering countless invaders, including Goribas, while Boros awaits on his throne.
11	11	"The Dominator of the Universe"; Transliteration: "Zen Uchū no Hasha" (Japanese: 全宇宙の覇者)	Yōsuke Hatta	Yoshiaki Kawajiri	Se Jun Kim & Shōsuke Ishibashi	December 14, 2015	October 2, 2016
Geryuganshoop laments Groribas' defeat, noting only he and Melzargard remain as Boros' elite fighters. He warns Boros that the ship is being ravaged by a human intruder. Outside, Melzargard regenerates endlessly against Puri-Puri Prisoner's attacks, then sends one head to request aid from the ship, only for Metal Bat to smash it down. Atomic Samurai, Bang, and Puri-Puri Prisoner combine forces against him. While Melzargard telepathically requests a cleansing bombardment from Geryuganshoop, Metal Bat discovers and crushes a marble hidden inside one of his heads, destroying it. Meanwhile, Geryuganshoop attempts to telekinetically guide Saitama away, but Saitama outwits him and storms the control room. Geryuganshoop then unleashes his psychic powers, only to be instantly killed when Saitama flicks a pebble at him. As the bombardment begins, Tatsumaki intercepts missiles and hurls them back, devastating the ship. On the ground, Mumen Rider rescues civilians, joined by Stinger and Lightning Max. Bang manages to destroy another marble, but Melzargard knocks him unconscious. Left with one final head, Melzargard threatens Atomic Samurai, who responds with his ultimate technique. Deep within the ship, Saitama confronts Boros, who reveals he came seeking a worthy foe. Saitama's punch shatters Boros' armor, releasing his full power.
12	12	"The Strongest Hero"; Transliteration: "Saikyō no Hīrō" (Japanese: 最強のヒーロー)	Shingo Natsume	Shingo Natsume	Chikashi Kubota	December 21, 2015	October 9, 2016
Boros unleashes his full power against Saitama, their clash tearing through the ship. As the fight progresses, Boros kicks Saitama to the moon. Back on Earth, Mumen Rider, Stinger, and Lightning Max evacuate the remaining survivors of City A. Tanktop Master hurls rubble at the ship, which Tatsumaki amplifies with projectiles. Having recovered, Bang crushes the final marble, ending Melzargard. Saitama rockets back from the moon, smashing into the ship and forcing it downwards. Boros channels a world-ending energy attack, but Saitama counters with a single Serious Punch, completely overwhelming him. Acknowledging he was nowhere near Saitama's level, Boros dies satisfied. Amai Mask arrives to chastise the S-Class for City A's obliteration, while Metal Knight salvages the ship's remains. Superalloy Darkshine discovers alien survivors, but Amai Mask promptly executes them. Saitama exits the ship, only for Tornado to berate him, accusing him of stealing her victory. Genos defends his master, calling her a brat, which earns him a violent reprimand. Bang intervenes, scolding her. Using Metal Knight's salvaged parts, the Hero Association rebuilds HQ over City A's ruins, inviting A and S-Class heroes to reside there. In the post-credits scene, Saitama obliterates Pluton: King of the Underworld with one punch.
