= List of Corpse Princess episodes =

Corpse Princess (屍姫, Shikabane Hime) is an anime series based on the manga of the same title by Yoshiichi Akahito. Produced by Feel and Gainax, the first season, also known as Shikabane Hime: Aka (屍姫 赫, Corpse Princess: Red), premiered in Japan on AT-X on October 2, 2008, and ran until December 25, 2008. The episodes also air on BS11, Chiba TV, KBS Kyoto, Sun TV, Tokyo MX, TV Aichi, TV Kanagawa and TV Saitama. A second season, subtitled Shikabane Hime: Kuro (屍姫 玄, Corpse Princess: Black), has been announced and began airing in Japan in January 2009. A series of Japanese DVDs, with each of them containing 4 episodes, will start being released on January 7, 2009.

The series is licensed for North American distribution and release by Funimation Entertainment. On October 24, 2008, the first thirteen episodes began airing online with English subtitles through Funimation's official YouTube, Joost, and Hulu channels, with higher end downloadable versions released on the company's own website. Funimation noted that they hope this relatively quick release through online means will help prevent piracy. Additionally, according to the president of Funimation Entertainment Gen Fukunaga, "by the time a licensing deal is signed to bring a series from Japan to the U.S. the episodes are already available as illegal downloads."

== Episode list ==
=== Shikabane Hime: Aka ===
No.	Title	Original release date
1	"The Dead Dance"; Transliteration: "Shi ga Mau" (Japanese: 死が舞う)	October 2, 2008
Makina Hoshimura, a deceased teenager reanimated as a Shikabane Hime under control of a secretive sect of Buddhist Monks, is introduced as she continues her mission to eliminate other undead Shikabane on Earth using her fists, feet or dual-wielded MAC-10 sub-machine pistols. Her target is Hagino, a charismatic psychopath with a penchant for serial-killing women, who rose from the dead as a Shikabane. The world of local high school student and orphan Ouri Kagami is shaken when he encounters Makina after she is knocked out during an early encounter with the monstrous Hagino. Unbeknownst to Ouri, his older brother-figure, Keisei Tagami, is somehow involved with Makina as well.
2	"The Game Continues"; Transliteration: "Yūgi no Tsuzuki" (Japanese: 遊戯のつづき)	October 16, 2008
After three children killed in a highway accident come back to life as Shikabane, Makina is dispatched to kill them. However, Ouri unwittingly interferes when he helps one of the Shikabane escape, mistaking her for a normal child named Hikaru, which irritates Makina. Keisei, Contracted Monk and Makina's counterpart, along with his fellow monks who are part of an anti-corpse group known as the Kougon Sect, assist Makina in taking down the three Shikabane children, who combine themselves into one while being pursued in a park. After Ouri shows Makina a drawing that Hikaru had sketched of her family, he runs back to his apartment in tears.
3	"Voice of Night"; Transliteration: "Yoru no Koe" (Japanese: 夜の声)	October 19, 2008
An unknown Shikabane, heard by a cry of a baby, is responsible for killing young women, and Makina finds her task difficult in hunting it down. Ouri, who was sick from school, finds himself inside an infirmary of a newborn nursery, in the care of a doctor named Sunao Rukuoka, soon crossing paths with Makina. After Makina finds a baby housed alone in the nursery and attempts to shoot it against Ouri's plea, they are attacked by a Shikabane, revealed to be the baby's mother. Keisei learns from Rika Aragami that someone familiar with Shikabane is conducting illegal experiments on inanimate dead bodies in order to turn them into monstrous Shikabane. Although Rukuoka tries to do this to Makina, she frees herself and shoots the Shikabane to its death. When Makina then points her gun at Rukuoka, Keisei arrives and manages to stop her before she pulls the trigger.
4	"Hymn of Tragedy"; Transliteration: "Sanbika" (Japanese: 惨美歌)	October 23, 2008
Keisei dispatches Makina to destroy a J-pop singer named Kun Osaki, rumored to have become a Shikabane after refusing to accept her death without having a concert. However, the job is made more difficult because Osaki has ties to organized yakuza mobsters, who interfered with the first assassination attempt after being tipped off by a mysterious monk. Ouri, digging for information regarding a fire that had killed Makina and her family in the past, is led to her tombstone in the Hakuji Temple. After he finds Makina there, she explains that Osaki is her next target, which urges him to help her no matter what. The two go back to find Osaki, who then turns into a Shikabane. Keisei arrives and explains to Ouri the relationship between Shikabane Hime and Contracted Monks. While playing a soundtrack from Osaki's album cover, Keisei gives Makina a hand in destroying Osaki.
5	"Traitor Monk"; Transliteration: "Haishinsō" (Japanese: 背信僧)	October 30, 2008
Keisei tells Ouri the true nature of his job, which later results in his suspension from duty. A Shikabane that has taken the form of an SUV lurks in a rental car facility at night, killing all who dare to ride in it. A mysterious but beautiful transfer student named Itsuki Yamagami arrives in the school, who becomes good friends with Ouri on her first day. As Makina is left on her own to track down the SUV at night, she finds Ouri and Itsuki at the rental car facility. As the three ride inside the SUV, it takes control and tells them to kill each other until one is left, lest they all will die. In retaliation, Makina shoots the SUV from the inside and kicks Ouri out. Ouri encounters a traitor priest of the Kougon Sect, explaining that the Shikabane Hime will gain entry to heaven after killing 108 Shikabane. Itsuki happens to be a Shikabane Hime in the care of a Contracted Monk named Takamasa Sogi.
6	"At the End of the Dangerous Run"; Transliteration: "Yōsō no Hate" (Japanese: 妖走の果て)	November 6, 2008
The traitor priest is revealed to be Akasha Shishido, a member of the Kougon Sect who went rogue due to his radical views regarding Shikabane Hime. Makina defeats the SUV Shikabane after being assisted by Keisei, who violated his suspension in doing so, having to severe her right arm in sacrifice. After figuring out that Akasha used a dark artifact to create Shikabane from the human lives suffered inside the SUV, a desperate Keisei turns the dark artifact against Akasha, temporarily routing the rogue priest, but at great cost to his own health. Ouri narrowly avoids a sniper's bullet from a heretofore unseen third Shikabane Hime and Contracted Monk observing the battle from above. The entire Kougon Sect is shocked to learn that Akasha has resurfaced. Keisei is reinstated but is recovering from the psychic backlash of using the dark artifact.
7	"The False Power of Words"; Transliteration: "Nisegotodama" (Japanese: 偽言魂)	November 13, 2008
It is explained that Akasha was the sole survivor of a suppression unit that were after a group of powerful Shikabane five years ago, and his Shikabane Hime was split in half during the battle. After failing to restore her body a week later, he stole secrets ritual scriptures before going rogue. Ouri talks to his classmate Sumitori, who shows Ouri a blog written by an ex-classmate named Mitsuyoshi, rumored to have been electrocuted. Ouri deduces that Mitsuyoshi had earlier have dropped out of school and somehow later turned into a Shikabane with telekinetic abilities. After encountering Mitsuyoshi at night, Ouri is protected by a new Shikabane Hime and Contracted Monk: a brawler Minai Ruo and her cold, cruel handler Shuji Isaki. Despite Makina and Minai's intervention in trying to kill him, Mitsuyoshi's abilities and his fighting strength resist their efforts to subdue him.
8	"Serenity"; Transliteration: "Yasuragi" (Japanese: 安らぎ)	November 20, 2008
Mitsuyoshi is stunned after hearing Sumitori's voice through Ouri's cellphone, allowing Minai to defeat Mitsuyoshi. The next day, Minai needs to confiscate to Ouri's cellphone as evidence, but offers to replace his cellphone in return. Shuji, trying to contact Minai but with no response, is kidnapped and later killed by thugs he had offended recently before. This causes Minai to begin reverting to an evil Shikabane driven solely by its regret. She is hunted down by Saki Amase, who wields a giant hammer. When Saki hesitates to kill Minai, Ouri flees and secrets her away into a bar where he works part-time, going out to plan a way for her to escape from the city. Unbeknownst to Ouri, his manager is a Contracted Monk. However, sympathetic to Minai's plight, Minai is told that if she makes a new contract with Ouri as her Contracted Monk, she will be able to return to being a Shikabane Hime, but she chooses to destroy herself instead.
9	"Set Your Heart Aflutter"; Transliteration: "Sono Mune ni Tokimeki wo" (Japanese: その胸にトキメキを)	November 27, 2008
Makina saves a group of students exploring a haunted building from a Shikabane as a bandit that attacked them with money. Nozomi Kasuga, one of the students, becomes infatuated with Makina and obsessed with death. Ouri questions an uncommunicative Makina about what happened to Minai. Curious about Ouri's compassion for Shikabane Hime and sensitivity to Shikabane, Makina approaches Keisei, who describes Ouri's first appearance at the orphanage at the age of three. Ouri was disaffected and detached from the world until he rescued a black cat crying by the riverbed. Shortly afterwards, the black cat was tragically run over by a car. Ouri, deeply affected by this incident, became keenly aware of death. Nozomi finds Makina and suggests that Ouri could never know Makina like she does, but Makina retorts by stating Ouri knows more about her than Nozomi ever will.
10	"Stars on the Ground"; Transliteration: "Chi ni Hoshi" (Japanese: 地に星)	December 4, 2008
After learning that Minai was destroyed by a member of the Kougon Sect. Keishi rushes out of his hospital room to confront the Gon Dai Sojo, but he is calmed by the Dai Sojo. Nozomi shows Ouri a magazine article featuring a cult with followers that regenerate after being burned alive. Under the belief that it is related to the Shikabane, Ouri attends the cult's meeting, but is not impressed. The cult's founder Ooyatsuka is confronted and then killed by a powerful group of Shikabane known as the Seven Stars. The traitor monk Akasha allies himself with the Seven Stars to plot the total destruction of his former comrades at the Kougon Sect. Meanwhile, Keisei identifies the Contracted Monk who destroyed Minai as Sadahiro Mibu, Ouri's manager at the bar. With their cover blown, Sadahiro and his Shikabane Hime named Akira Tōoka abandon the bar, leaving Ouri unemployed. Makina has flashbacks of the Seven Stars, suggesting she was assaulted and killed by them.
11	"One Night"; Transliteration: "Aru Yoru" (Japanese: ある夜)	December 11, 2008
The Kougon Sect discover from surveillance videos the Seven Stars are in the area, led by Hokuto. As Rika assigns Keisei to pursue the Seven Stars, this gives Makina the resolve to finally have her vengeance against them. Ouri returns to living at the orphanage for the time being since he is unemployed, and Keishi reveals more about his bond with Makina. He had been raised by Makina's parents as a child before moving into the orphanage owned by Riko when he got older. However, after the Seven Stars burned Makina's family alive, he eventually agreed to make a pact to be Makina's Contracted Monk for her to avenge her family. Meanwhile, the plan to destroy the Kougon Sect advances when Ena makes his move and possesses Ouri. Kowaku and Akasha attack Makina and Keisei at the temple grounds. As Akasha retreats after revealing that this frontal assault was a ruse, Keisei goes in hot pursuit and Makina is left at the temple grounds to engage Kowaku. While checking on the safety of the orphans, Keisei is stabbed by the possessed Ouri.
12	"Dawn"; Transliteration: "Yoake" (Japanese: 夜明け)	December 18, 2008
After releasing Ouri from being possessed by Ena, Akasha appears and mortally wounds Keisei, taking out his left eye. Makina, struggling at this moment, is having a hard time shooting Kowaku due to his ability to change the makeup of his body. When Kowaku follows Makina into the orphanage, Keisei uses ancient scrolls to harden Kowaku's body and then to attack Akasha. Keisei, suffering from his wounds, transfers his pact to Ouri, much to Makina's sadness. With a new resolve, Makina destroys Kowaku, which drains much of Ouri's energy. However, Akasha still has some pity for Ouri and secretly heals his bruises.
13	"Funeral Program for a Contracted Monk"; Transliteration: "Keiyakusō Kokubetsushiki Shidai" (Japanese: 契約僧告別式次第)	December 25, 2008
During the funeral, Ouri is approached by head inspector Rinsen Shirae, who says that Keisei was called into heaven before turning into a Shikabane. Later on, Sougen Takamine, Keisei's first mentor, defines and describes the roles of the Shikabane, Shikabane Hime and Contracted Monks. He then explains that it is the deed of the Shikabane Hime to kill 108 Shikabane to gain entry into heaven. Although Rinsen advises him not to, Ouri decides to become a Contracted Monk to honor Keisei's name and look after Makina's welfare. He encounters Sadahiro and Akira, who were aware of Ouri's involvement with Makina due to his former acquaintance with Minai before she was destroyed. Before they leave, he tells them that he is determined to become a Contracted Monk just like his older brother. Sprinkled throughout the episode are brief scenes from the series.

=== Shikabane Hime: Kuro ===
No.	Title	Original release date
1	"Path of Light"; Transliteration: "Hikari no Michisuji" (Japanese: 光の道筋)	January 1, 2009
The Seven Stars tell traitor monk Akasha Shishido that they plan to go after Makina Hoshimura, them being faulted for creating such a powerful Shikabane Hime. Rika Aragami learns that Makina has been imprisoned for six months in the purification chamber near the head temple and surrounded by spirits, and Sougen Takamine explains that these spirits are eating at her rune of regrets. Meanwhile, Ouri undergoes priest training during this time with Contracted Monks Kanechika Umehara and Takamasa Sogi, but he failed to create a bond with a rabbit and catch it. His training is cut off when an incident at the purification chamber occurs. Akasha has turned one of the monks into a Shikabane to capture Makina. Ouri arrives just in time to embrace her, diminishing her rune and allowing her to kill the monk.
2	"My Enemy"; Transliteration: "Waga Teki" (Japanese: 我が敵)	January 8, 2009
As Takamasa and his Shikabane Hime Itsuki Yamagami come to retrieve Ouri and Makina from a group of monks, Akasha and the Seven Stars trap all but Takamasa and Itsuki in an invisible trench, which leaves Ouri helpless as Makina suffers at the hands of Hazama. The Seven Stars claim to have released their "true nature" in order to live their life without regrets. Makina reminisces about her experience as a Shikabane Hime with her former Contracted Monk Keisei Tagami, giving her the drive to attack Hazama. However, Hokuto, the leader of the Seven Stars, easily repels her. Some of the Contracted Monks and Shikabane Hime manage to break into the trench from the outside, causing Akasha and the Seven Stars to retreat for now, seeing Makina as their enemy.
3	"Beloved Aberration"; Transliteration: "Itoshiki Igyō" (Japanese: 愛しき異形)	January 15, 2009
Ouri resumes his priest training with Takamasa, while Makina is guided by Rika to complete an enkiri inside a cave to rid herself of the rotten rune. Meanwhile, the Seven Stars are discussing their next scheme to defeat Makina, and Ena will be the first to pursue her. Makina, still succumbing to her bond with Keisei, breaks out of the cave and escapes past Rika's reach. While in the hot springs, Ouri is approached by Makina, demanding to be released from the contract due to his lack of strength. However, Makina is soon restrained by Rika and her Shikabane Hime Saki Amase and then imprisoned. Later on, Takamasa takes Ouri to observe one of his missions to kill a Shikabane.
4	"Itsuki's Form"; Transliteration: "Itsuki no Katachi" (Japanese: 異月の貌)	January 22, 2009
The episode shows a flashback when Takamasa and Itsuki became a team about four years ago. After having died in a bus accident, Itsuki became a Shikabane Hime under Takamasa. The two struggled with a Shikabane in the form of a werewolf at first, but they managed to gun the werewolf down after a second encounter. Although they have grown closer with each other, Takamasa was reminded not to treat Itsuki as a normal human girl. Itsuki transferred as a student with Takamasa, befriending fellow classmate Tomoharu Kishibe, who was aware that Takamasa loves Itsuki. One day, when Tomoharu was heading out-of-town with his parents, they were hit by a reckless young driver, swerving their car off a cliff. It is revealed that Tomoharu became a Shikabane four years ago to control the cars driven by young drivers and cause collisions. As Takamasa could not bring himself to permit Itsuki to kill Tomoharu, she suddenly transformed into a Shikabane. After accidentally wounding Takamasa in the process, she reverted to a Shikabane Hime. Learning his lesson from the past, Takamasa unhesitatingly allows Itsuki to shoot Tomoharu.
5	"Nature and Regrets"; Transliteration: "Saga to Miren" (Japanese: 性と未練)	January 29, 2009
Takamasa assists Itsuki in defeating Tomoharu in a parking garage. Rika and Saki inform Ouri that a revived Keisei has been spotted in the mountains. Makina finds Keisei there, but as she senses something different about him, she falls down into a ditch. Ouri, arriving at the forest and encountering Sadahiro Mibu there as well, runs off to find Makina, while Rika prevents Sadahiro from interfering. When Keisei attempts to make a move on Makina, Ouri impales him with a spear, causing him to walk away. After Ouri comforts Makina, Sadahiro acknowledges Makina's struggle to break her bond with her former Contracted Monk. Ena is uncovered to be the one disguised as Keisei, reappearing with duplicates of Keisei.
6	"Monster Named Happiness"; Transliteration: "Kōfuku to Iu Kaibutsu" (Japanese: 幸福という怪物)	February 5, 2009
Ouri uses his staff to take out Ena, only for the latter to transfer his soul into each of the duplicates of Keisei. After Ena reverts to his normal body, he attacks Makina using a spinning metal ball and starts to grind her hand. Although this takes a toll on Ouri, Makina somehow manages to stop the ball from spinning and causes it to shatter. Ena, one who is obsessed with beauty, is finally shot by Makina. Meanwhile, Nozomi Kasuga, who was searching for Makina, is approached by Toya, who manipulates her with a balloon tied around her neck. After Ouri attends an imperial ordinance of the Kōgon Sect concerning precaution against the remaining Seven Stars, Rika gives Ouri a robe that Keisei left behind. Makina invites Ouri into her apartment, confirming her intimate contract with him. As Ouri returns to his apartment, Nozomi barges in and pushes him onto the floor, asking him to kill her.
7	"Mundane Wish"; Transliteration: "Arifureta Nozomi" (Japanese: ありふれた望み)	February 12, 2009
As Nozomi attempts to seduce Ouri, the black cat shows Ouri that she is being controlled by an ever growing balloon. Classmate Mizuki Inuhiko enters his room and smacks Nozomi in hopes of getting her back to normal, but as Nozomi escapes, Mizuki tells Ouri that Nozomi loves him. Makina hears of the incidents at school and runs there, only to encounter Nozimi, who manages to bind Makina to a balloon before running away. Makina sees an illusion of a bizarre amusement park, where she finds Toya, who believes death is "happiness". Ouri catches up with Nozomi, who is about to be consumed by her own "happiness" in a form of a Shikabane. After Makina defeats Toya, it turns out to be a little girl raised by a poor family. When Toya and her parents had gone to an amusement park one day, they poisoned her and then themselves, which led her to believe that death and happiness are the same. Hizuchi, the one who revealed this story, then knocks Makina unconscious. Ouri makes an attempt to destroy the Shikabane but fails. When Hizuchi appears, he destroys the Shikabane, killing Nozomi in the process.
8	"My Mother Was Defiled"; Transliteration: "Waga Haha wa Kegare Tamaishi" (Japanese: 我が母は穢れたまいし)	February 26, 2009
Makina wakes up in the headquarters of the Seven Stars and fight Hokuto while Hazama watches them. Ouri is brought to the Kōgon Sect, where he learns that he is a child of a Shikabane. After he loses control when he remembers his childhood, he is then kicked him out of the sect, being relieving of his job as a Contracted Monk, much to his worry. A small scuffle over Saki and Itsuki allows him to escape back to the orphanage. Hazama and Isaka discuss their next move to combat what the sect is planning soon. Ouri is told by Riko that when he first came to the orphanage as a child, there were cases of missing children in the area during that time. When one of the children has gone missing, Ouri runs to the riverbank, only to find a group of children near Hizuchi, who reveals he was killed by Ouri's "mother" in the past, having a grudge against Ouri for being the only one left alive.
9	"The Value of the Living"; Transliteration: "Shōja no Kachi" (Japanese: 生者の価値)	March 5, 2009
Ouri had been the sole survivor when Ouri's mother kidnapped and killed many children when she became a Shikabane. On the other hand, Hizuchi, among the children, had regretted trying to survive by eating anything he could find before he died. Though Keisei had adopted Ouri back then, he was hoping to keep this a secret from Ouri. All of a sudden, Ouri is engulfed by the black cat, turning him into a Shikabane. Akasha explains to Makina that Hokuto was born and raised to be a human sacrifice, but instead she turned into a Shikabane with no regrets in her life, being defined as death itself. Overwhelmed by her strength, Makina is no match against Hokuto, who throws her into the lake. When Makina senses Ouri in danger, she gets right back up, having a reason to fight. As Ouri tries to commit suicide with fire, the black cat takes over, revealed to be the kidnapped children in the past. When Hizuchi prepares to finish Ouri off, Makina arrive just in time to help, allowing the both of them to take Hizuchi down.
10	"To the Other Side of Hell"; Transliteration: "Jigoku no Saki e" (Japanese: 地獄の先へ)	March 12, 2009
The remaining Seven Stars commence the final action of their plan as planes all over the city crash into buildings creating countless Shikabane. All Contracted Monks and their Shikabane Hime are sent to take on their greatest mission yet and fight off the hordes. When Akasha, Hokuto and Hazama travel toward the purification chamber, Sadahiro and Akira block their path and attack them, only for each of them to evade to the purification chamber. When Ouri and Makina arrive, Sadahiro and Akira prohibit them from entering the purification chamber, but Makina manages to get in with Ouri's help. In the purification chamber, Hokuto breaks through the barrier created by the bishop Tokihana Shiou and punches right through his body. Akasha then tells Hokuto to destroy a mysterious casket there, breaking the bond of all Contracted Monks and causing each Shikabane Hime to begin to collapse.
11	"One Hundred and Eight Lies"; Transliteration: "Hyakuhachi no Uso" (Japanese: 一〇八の嘘)	March 19, 2009
The secret of the bond between the Contracted Monks and Shikabane Hime is revealed. The casket contained the daughter of the founder of the Kōgon Sect, who had resurrected his daughter and preserved her into a Shikabane Hime long ago, and destroying her meant that all bonds were to be broken. Akasha turns the tables, making Hokuto his Shikabane Hime, and kills Hazama. Ouri and Makina find and confront Akasha and Hokuto inside the purification chamber. Akasha explains he became best friends with Hibiki Shijo since childhood, soon becoming lovers with each other. But one day, she became very ill, which led to her death. Akasha decided to make Hibiki his Shikabane Hime. It was Hazama who planned the attack of the Shikabane five years ago, and Hibiki was able to destroy 108 Shikabane during this gruesome battle. However, she turned into a Shikabane, forcing Akasha to kill his own Shikabane Hime. Akasha realized that the concept of gaining entry into heaven was in fact a total lie. After Akasha and Hokuto destroys the purification chamber, Ouri and Makina find new power through friendship as they continue to fight.
12	"Beyond the Dead"; Transliteration: "Kabane no Hate" (Japanese: 屍の果て)	March 26, 2009
Most of the other Contracted Monks and Shikabane face off against Isaka and Toya, being able to defeat the both of them. Makina continues her fight against Hokuto but is easily overwhelmed. Sadahiro and Akira start shooting down the purification chamber, shooting Hibiki's coffin in the process. Akasha breaks down in tears, but is relieved when the corpse still moves. When Hokuto sees this, she brutally murders Akasha and escapes with Hazama. Later, Kamika Todoroki informs most of the other Shikabane Hime that Makina has gone missing, but they know that she is fine because Ouri is with her. Ouri offers Makina to live in the orphanage, giving her a chance to live a normal life. When Ouri's classmates mention about Nozomi, Ouri leave with Makina, who contemplates what it means to truly be alive. Makina wants Ouri to understand that her purpose in life is to fight death, but Ouri later disagrees. The two sense Hokuto and Hazama inside an abandoned apartment. There, Hokuto bursts through the wall and attacks at full force, and Makina gives it her all as she fights back.
OVA	"Even So, As a Human"; Transliteration: "Soredemo, Hito Toshite" (Japanese: それでも、人として)	August 5, 2009 (DVD only)
This is when both Ouri and Makina knew nothing. Minai Ruo stabs her abusive boyfriend in the back, but jumps off the roof in remorse, only to be revived as a Shikabane. Although Keisei is suggested to be her Contracted Monk, Shuji Isaki volunteers to make her his Shikabane Hime instead. At night, Keisei assists Minai in fighting off a Shikabane that attacked Isaki, who rendered her useless at first. Later, Minai is led to a parking garage after being shot at by Akira, who explains that her bond with Isaki is incomplete, given that her bullet wound was slow to heal. Akira leaves to see Sadahiro when Isaki catches up to Minai. Later that night, Isaki brings Minai with him in an attempt to kill a Shikabane in a shrine, later recognized as his family home, only to encounter his older brother there. It is revealed that Isaki wanted to kill his brother for wasting his inheritance to build the main hall inside the shrine. From then on, Isaki and Minai found their bond together. The inspector named Honda tells Keisei that Sadahiro and Akira found out that Isaki and Minai previously met as kids inside an okonomiyaki restaurant. This is actually where their bond originated.
