= Recap sequence =

Narrative device used on television series

A recap sequence (or recap, often announced as "Previously on...") is a narrative device used by many television series to bring the viewer up to date with the current events of the stories' plot. It is usually a short (between 20 and 40 seconds) montage of important scenes cut directly from previous episodes, usually short bursts of dialogue, which serve to lay the background for the following episode.

== Purpose ==
These devices are predominantly seen on episodic series where every installment furthers the plot, but otherwise are used for plot arcs, that is, when an episode is going to pick up on a storyline initiated several episodes ago. A recap will almost always be present in an episode that picks up from a cliffhanger. Recap sequences are most prevalent in dramatic television series (though daytime serials are usually excluded) and reality programs, whereas situation comedies and other scripted genres typically use recap sequences only for two-part or in rare cases, multi-part episodes.

These montages are inserted as the first thing into an episode so that viewers who had not seen the previous episodes or who do not remember what happened can understand from where the current episode will begin, also so that the viewers may decide to catch up on missed episodes, usually buying the DVDs. They usually begin with a voiceover or subtitle proclaiming, "Last week on... [the show's name]", "Last night on... [the show's name]", "Previously on... [the show's name]" or "Last time on... [the show's name]". Many shows have begun to use a main character's voice for this voiceover rather than a neutral narrator (Chuck), and some series such as Boston Legal and Stargate Atlantis alternate which main character says "Previously on... [the show's name]". Some shows also have a full season recap sequence that usually begins with "This season on... [the show's name]".

== Examples ==
On the Fox show 24, the main character, Jack Bauer's voiceover "Previously on 24..." is followed by scenes from prior episodes of the current season, not necessarily from the very last episode, that concern major plot points of the current episode. This was carried over into 24: The Game, where, once a player completes a mission, all cutscenes prior to that mission can be viewed in the manner of the TV show. The playable scenes are not shown, as the player is given the opportunity to replay them to get a higher score.

On the NBC show ER, main cast members rotate turns saying the phrase "Previously on ER..." which is then followed by scenes from previous episodes which are pertinent to the current episode.

In some cases, the scene leading up to the previous episode's ending is shown instead of a montage. This was common on British television shows from the 1950s to 1990s, although now most adopt a recap montage. An example of this is Doctor Who, which during its original run (1963–1989) used the final scene of the previous episode to begin the next, whereas from the series relaunch (2005–present) the recaps are made up of a collection of short clips.

Recaps are also used for several soap operas, most notably in Australia. The Australian prison soap opera Prisoner (commonly known as Prisoner: Cell Block H) used a recap sequence throughout its eight-season run. In the early years it only showed the final scene of the previous episode before the opening credits. However, in later years it began to show several select cuts from the previous episode during the recap sequence, often, a new scene would directly follow the recap before the opening credits. In the early years of Australian soaps Home and Away, Neighbours and Sons and Daughters a recap showed directly after the opening credits, which may have been confusing for viewers who would have started watching them, not realizing they were viewing a recap sequence and not a new opening scene. The layout was changed in later years as recaps for Home and Away and Neighbours started before the credits, but currently they again show after the credits in such a way not to confuse the viewer. British soap operas, apart from Hollyoaks, do not use a recap sequence, however, they may be relevant.

In the English dubs of various episodic anime series that were edited for time or censorship reasons, recaps are sometimes extended or introduced where they did not exist originally, to cover any shortfalls in running time. Some examples where this occurs are Robotech, the FUNimation English dub of Dragon Ball Z, and the 4Kids English-language version of One Piece. The original Japanese version of One Piece did not always have recaps, though many episodes did have recaps as the first scene following the opening credits.

== Status as part of episodes ==
There is some debate as to whether these recaps should be considered as part of the episode whole. Some home video and DVD releases of shows that use recaps include them, some do not, and some seem to randomly use or omit them for different episodes within the same collection. A few also place the segment as a full chapter that can easily be skipped if the viewer is viewing the series in a marathon form.

== Format and recap episodes ==
The format and treatment of recaps may also vary depending on the commissioning broadcaster. For example, while most HBO series have recaps before each episode when aired on linear television, the recaps are usually treated as distinct from the episode proper, airing prior to the content rating card and HBO "static angel" production logo. On streaming (i.e. HBO Max) and other releases like DVDs, these recaps are usually excluded from the episode video, but are sometimes provided as bonus content.

Recaps can also refer to entire episodes, where such explain a backstory or plot point the viewer has not seen up to that point. Such episodes usually happen after a plot twist, for the recap to explore what led up to that point that the viewer does not know.

== Television series which use a recap sequence ==
=== Australia ===
- Doctor Doctor
- Home and Away (shown after the opening credits from 1988–1999, 2009–present; shown before the opening credits 2000–2008)
- McLeod's Daughters (the recap sequence was shown before a cold open and the opening credits for the first seven seasons. The cold open was later removed and the recap was shown after the opening credits for its eighth and final season)
- Neighbours
- Prisoner (also known as Prisoner: Cell Block H; the recap was shown before the opening credits for the majority of its eight-season; it was shown only in episode 2 after the opening credits; episode 290 was the only episode not to show a recap, when it was replaced with a cold open)
- Sons and Daughters (recap shown after the opening credits throughout its six-season run)
- Wentworth

=== United Kingdom ===
- Alys
- Back to Life
- Bad Girls
- The Bill
- Brookside (used only in final year)
- Doctor Who (only during multi-part episodes)
- Fleabag
- Footballers' Wives
- Hollyoaks
- Outnumbered
- Primeval (used until the second season)
- The Professionals
- Sugar Rush
- Two Pints of Lager and a Packet of Crisps

=== United States ===
- 24
- Alias
- All American (up until Season 2 Episode 10)
- Andi Mack
- Angel
- Avatar: The Last Airbender
- Awkward
- Battlestar Galactica
- Black Lightning
- Ben 10 (only during two-part episodes)
- Ben 10: Alien Force (only during two-part episodes)
- Ben 10: Ultimate Alien (only during two-part episodes)
- The Big Bang Theory
- Blindspot
- Bob Hearts Abishola
- The Boys (used since the second season)
- Breaking Bad
- Buffy the Vampire Slayer
- Chucky
- Deception
- Desperate Housewives
- ER (these are preceded by a short stylized logo sequence and followed by the episode's title; however, on the DVD releases and occasionally in syndicated reruns, the recaps are edited out, leaving only the logo sequence and the title)
- The Falcon and the Winter Soldier
- The Flash (2014) (up until Season 6 Episode 11)
- Fringe
- Game of Thrones (these only appear on the HBO airings; in syndication and on DVDs, the recaps are excluded)
- Georgie & Mandy's First Marriage
- Glee
- The Good Doctor
- Hawkeye
- iCarly (only on specials)
- Invincible - (used since the fourth episode)
- Jane the Virgin
- K.C. Undercover (only during multi-part episodes)
- Loki
- Lost
- Lucifer
- The Mandalorian
- Marvel's Agents of S.H.I.E.L.D. (used since the tenth episode)
- Masters of Sex
- Mom
- Moon Knight
- Ms. Marvel
- NCIS (only during multi-part episodes)
- Nip/Tuck
- Once Upon a Time
- The Originals
- Power Book II: Ghost
- Pretty Little Liars
- Prison Break
- Riverdale
- Sliders
- Soap
- Sons of Anarchy
- Star Trek: Discovery
- Switched at Birth
- Suits
- Supernatural
- Third Watch
- Turner & Hooch
- The Vampire Diaries
- Veronica Mars
- The Walking Dead
- WandaVision
- Weeds
- The West Wing
- X-Men
- Young Sheldon
- Your Friendly Neighborhood Spider-Man

=== Other countries ===
- The Amazing Race
- Big Brother
- The Heart Has Its Reasons
- Ninjago
- Squid Game
- Survivor
- Yu-Gi-Oh

== See also ==
- Clip show
- Cliffhanger
- Montage
- Voice-over
