= A Chuck E. Cheese Christmas =

- Directed by: Zac Moncrief; Steve Trenbirth
- Written by: Zac Moncrief; Jon Colton Barry
- Based on: Chuck E. Cheese
- Produced by: Zac Moncrief; Jon Colton Barry
- Starring: Nathan Kress; Kari Wahlgren; Nolan North; Fred Tatasciore; Grey DeLisle; Michael Gough; Trevor Devall; Max Mittelman
- Music by: Zac Moncrief; Jon Colton Barry; Ben Bromfield; Jeff Barry
- Animation by: Pixel Zoo Animation Studios
- Production companies: Chuck E. Cheese; HappyNest Entertainment
- Distributed by: HappyNest Entertainment
- Release date: November 27, 2025
- Running time: 50 minutes
- Country: United States
- Language: English

A Chuck E. Cheese Christmas is a 2025 American animated television film. It is the first television film that features the mascot characters from the Chuck E. Cheese chain of family entertainment centers, and features the voices of Nathan Kress, Kari Wahlgren, Nolan North, Fred Tatasciore, Grey DeLisle, Michael Gough, and Trevor Devall. It is also the first Chuck E. Cheese film since Chuck E. Cheese in the Galaxy 5000 (1999).

Produced by HappyNest Entertainment, Pixel Zoo Animation Studios, Chuck E. Cheese, It was released on YouTube, Amazon Prime Video, Roku, Kidoodle TV, HappyKids, YouTube Kids, Samsung, LG, and Fire TV on November 27, 2025, serving as a backdoor pilot for a full series that's currently in the works.

== Plot ==
Chuck E. Cheese teams up with his friends and bandmates to deliver pizza when they notice a lack of holiday cheer. They reach out to Mrs. Claus who tells them Santa has been in low spirits as well. Chuck E. and friends find a naughty elf, Leggymos (an obvious reference to Legolos from The Lord of the Rings), who is resentful of the elves moving from warriors who fight trolls to building toys and spreading joy. He decides instead to ruin the Christmas party. Leggymos eventually realizes that by spreading Christmas cheer, he is still protecting the world from trolls and decides to team up with Chuck E. and his friends to ensure their Christmas party goes off well, bring Christmas joy back to Santa, and save Christmas.

== Cast ==
- Nathan Kress as Chuck E. Cheese and Elf #1
- Kari Wahlgren as Helen Henny, Mrs. Sandy Claus, and Elf #2
- Nolan North as Jasper Jowls and Rooftop Driver
- Fred Tatasciore as Munch, Santa Claus, and Troll King
- Grey DeLisle-Griffin as Bella Brinca, Mrs. Brinca, and Pedestrian
- Michael Gough as Pasqually, Mr. Brinca, and Tree Lot Owner
- Trevor Devall as Leggymos, Ronnie, and Party Store Employee
- Additional voices are provided by Max Mittelman.

== Production ==
In September 2020, CEC Entertainment CEO David McKillips said that the company had recently launched an entertainment division, the goal being to produce movies and TV shows featuring the CEC cast of characters. Prior to this, a 1983 Christmas TV special was released, titled "The Christmas That Almost Wasn't", which was produced by a Pizza Time Theatre subsidiary named Kadabrascope. It was planned to air on NBC that holiday season, but due to Pizza Time Theatre's financial troubles around that time partly caused by the video game crash of 1983, it was instead released at Pizza Time Theatre albeit mostly unfinished. And the most recent Film & TV endeavor was the 1999 direct-to-video film, titled "Chuck E. Cheese in the Galaxy 5000", produced by FUNimation Entertainment (Now Crunchyroll, LLC following Sony's acquisition of Anime SVOD service Crunchyroll in 2021).

In June 2025, CEC Entertainment announced the film, Initially titled "The Chuck E. Cheese Christmas Special", which will serve as a backdoor pilot for a full series entitled "Chuck E. and Friends", which as of 2026, the series has not yet officially been greenlit. It was also confirmed that the special would be produced by HappyNest Entertainment and animated by Brisbane-based Pixel Zoo Animation Studios.

=== Casting ===
The special features Nathan Kress as the voice of Chuck E. Cheese, as well as the voices of Grey DeLisle, Nolan North, Kari Wahlgren, Fred Tatasciore, Michael Gough, Trevor Devall, and Max Mittelman.

== Release and reception ==
The film premiered on both the official Chuck E. Cheese YouTube channel and on Amazon Prime on November 27, 2025. Prior to that date, a fifteen-minute watch party was held in all Chuck E. Cheese locations on November 23, at 10:30 am.

The special was described as a "heartfelt new comedy-adventure in the North Pole (complete with charming original songs)". The Daily Beast recommended the production. "A Chuck E. Cheese Christmas is pro-ghost kitchen propaganda that, in keeping with the company’s animatronic band roots, includes a musical number where Chuck E. and his pals sing about how the world would be lost without Christmas," wrote another review.
