= Max Mittelman =

American voice actor

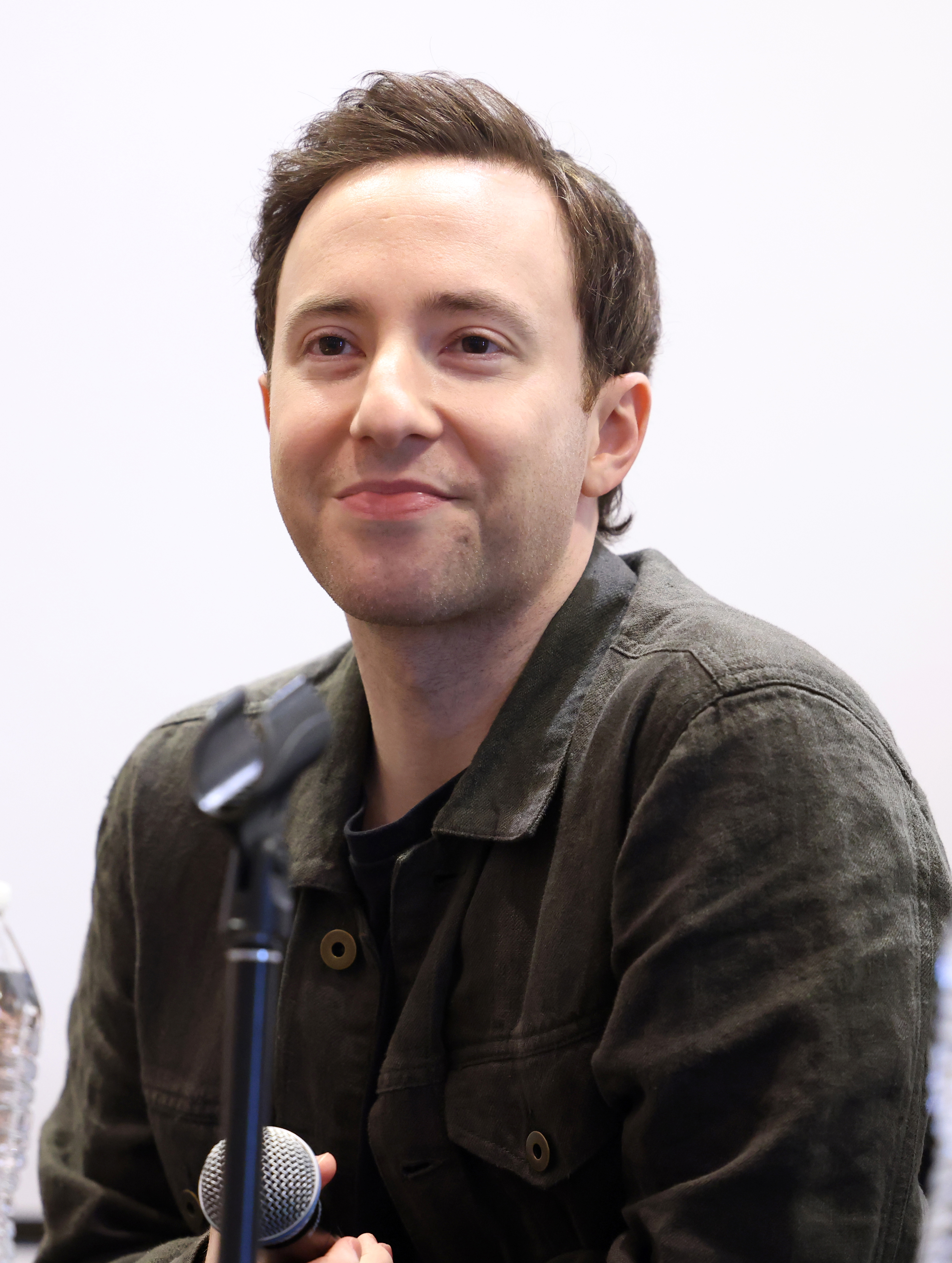
- Mittelman in 2025
- Education: University of Southern California
- Occupation: Voice actor
- Years active: 2013–present

Maxwell Mittelman is an American voice actor who provides various voices for English versions of anime, animation and video games.

== Early life ==
Mittelman is Jewish. He attended the University of Southern California.

== Career ==
Mittelman's major roles include Saitama in One-Punch Man, Kousei Arima in Your Lie in April, Hikari Sakishima in A Lull in the Sea, King from The Seven Deadly Sins, Ritsu Kageyama in Mob Psycho 100, Inaho Kaizuka in Aldnoah.Zero, Atsushi Nakajima in Bungo Stray Dogs and Io Flemming in Mobile Suit Gundam Thunderbolt, Kira Yamato in Mobile Suit Gundam SEED Remastered and Mobile Suit Gundam SEED Destiny Remastered, Nacht Faust from Black Clover, Haruto Kurosawa in Coppelion and Plagg from Miraculous: Tales of Ladybug & Cat Noir. In video games, he voices McBurn and Lechter Arundel in The Legend of Heroes: Trails of Cold Steel II, Shigure Rangetsu in Tales of Berseria, Ryuji Sakamoto in Persona 5, Troy Calypso in Borderlands 3, Peter Boggs in Grounded, Fidel Camuze in Star Ocean: Integrity and Faithlessness, Claude Wallace in Valkyria Chronicles 4, Louis in Code Vein, Red XIII in Final Fantasy VII Remake, Arataki Itto in Genshin Impact and Chuck E. Cheese in Chuck E. Cheese Minisodes, replacing Nathan Kress.

Mittelman and fellow voice actors Ray Chase and Robbie Daymond formed video game company Sassy Chap Games to develop the 2025 dating sim Date Everything!

== Filmography ==
=== Anime ===
List of English dubbing performances in anime
Year	Title	Role	Notes	Source
2014	Toradora!	Hisamitsu Noto	22 episodes	
2014	Magi: The Labyrinth of Magic	Yunan	Ep. 25	
2014	Doraemon	Soby	Also Stand by Me Doraemon	
2014	Blood Lad	Yoshida the Mimic	6 episodes	
2015	Coppelion	Haruto Kurosawa	8 episodes	
2015	Magi: The Kingdom of Magic	Yunan		
2015	A Lull in the Sea	Hikari Sakishima	26 episodes	
2015	Sword Art Online II	Jun	3 episodes	
2015–16	Aldnoah.Zero	Inaho Kaizuka	24 episodes	
2015–16	Durarara!!×2	Hiroto Shijima		
2015–21	The Seven Deadly Sins	King		
2016	Your Lie in April	Kousei Arima	22 episodes	
2016	Ajin	Ota	Eps. 1–2	
2016	Mobile Suit Gundam: Iron-Blooded Orphans	Ein Dalton		
2016	Charlotte	Arifumi Fukuyama	Ep. 4	
2016	Erased	Jun Shiratori		
2016–17	The Asterisk War	Eishiro Yabuki		
2016–20	One-Punch Man	Saitama	Also OVAs	
2016–22	Mob Psycho 100	Ritsu Kageyama		
2017	Berserk	Serpico	25 episodes	
2017	Occultic;Nine	Shun Moritsuka		
2017	Mobile Suit Gundam SEED	Kira Yamato	30 episodes; NYAV Post dub	
2017	Mobile Suit Gundam SEED Destiny	Kira Yamato	36 episodes; NYAV Post dub	
2017	Fate/Apocrypha	Shirou Kotomine/Shirou Amakusa Tokisada	16 episodes	
2017	Glitter Force Doki Doki	Momota		
2018	Bungo Stray Dogs	Atsushi Nakajima		
2018	Aggretsuko	Resasuke	3 episodes	
2018	Naruto Shippuden	Young Hashirama Senju	3 episodes	
2018–19	Hunter × Hunter	Meruem	21 episodes	
2018–24	Boruto: Naruto Next Generations	Konohamaru Sarutobi (adult)		
2019	Demon Slayer: Kimetsu no Yaiba	Sabito	2 episodes	
2020	Marvel Future Avengers	Makoto / Hurricane		
2020	Persona 5: The Animation	Ryuji Sakamoto		
2020–22	Ghost in the Shell: SAC 2045	Takashi Shimamura		
2021	Mr. Osomatsu	Todomatsu Matsuno		
2021	Vivy: Fluorite Eye's Song	Matsumoto		
2021	Black Clover	Nacht Faust		
2022	Fate/Grand Carnival	Amakusa Shirou, Fuuma "Evil-wind" Kotarou		
2023	The Legend of Heroes: Trails of Cold Steel – Northern War	Lechter Arundel	Ep. 5	
2024	Uzumaki	Katayama		
2025	Disney Twisted-Wonderland: The Animation	Ace Trappola	8 episodes	

=== Animation ===
List of voice performances in animation
Year	Title	Role	Notes	Source
2013	Ultimate Spider-Man	Rhino	Episode: "The Rhino"	
2014	Breadwinners	Poltergoose, Cloud Monster	2 episodes	
2015–16	Transformers: Rescue Bots	Blurr		
2015–present	Miraculous: Tales of Ladybug & Cat Noir	Plagg, Ivan Bruel		
2016	Justice League Action	Jimmy Olsen, Parasite		
2016–18	Ben 10	Overflow, additional voices		
2016–19	Shimmer and Shine	Various voices	15 episodes	
2017–18	Zak Storm	Caramba		
2017–19	Be Cool, Scooby-Doo!	Henry, Historical Celebration Son	2 episodes	
2017–20	Spider-Man	Harry Osborn / Hobgoblin, additional voices		
2018	Elena of Avalor	Bobo		
2019	Costume Quest	Dudley		
2019	The Adventures in School!	Alvin J. Boomerang		
2019	Where's Waldo?	Tarak	Episode: "The Big New Mexican Pepper Hunt"	
2019	Costume Quest	Various voices		
2019–2022	DC Super Hero Girls	Clark Kent / Superman		
2019–2021	Victor and Valentino	Fernando		
2020	ThunderCats Roar	Lion-O, WilyKat		
2020	Teen Titans Go!	Lion-O	Episode: "Teen Titans Roar!"	
2020	Amphibia	Francis	Episode: "A Caravan Named Desire"	
2020	Elena of Avalor	Big-Eared Noblin	Episode: "Heart of The Jaguar"	
2021	What If...?	Fandral	Episode: "What If... Thor Were an Only Child?"	
2022	Alice's Wonderland Bakery	Cheshire Cat		
2022	The Legend of Vox Machina	Desmond		
2022	The Boss Baby: Back in the Crib	Tim Templeton		
2022	Dragons: Rescue Riders	Bubbly the Bubblegill		
2022	Sharkdog	Brody Ceviche		
2023	Star Wars: The Bad Batch	Governor Grotton	Episode: "The Solitary Clone"	
2023–present	My Adventures with Superman	Lex Luthor, Hank Henshaw / Cyborg Superman, Atomic Skull, Thomas Weston, Dr. George Otto Binder	Recurring role	
2024	Tales of the Teenage Mutant Ninja Turtles	Various voices		
2026–present	The Doomies	Bobby Lafrousse	Main role	
2026	Chibiverse	Bobby Lafrousse	Episode: "Underground Monster Wrestling Club"	

=== Films ===
List of voice performances in films
Year	Title	Role	Notes	Source
2016	Kingsglaive: Final Fantasy XV	Tredd Furia		
2016	Mobile Suit Gundam Thunderbolt: December Sky	Io Fleming		
2017	A Silent Voice	Satoshi Mashiba		
2017	Boruto: Naruto the Movie	Konohamaru Sarutobi (adult)		
2017	Mobile Suit Gundam Thunderbolt: Bandit Flower	Io Fleming		
2018	The Death of Superman	Jimmy Olsen	Direct-to-video	
2018	DC Super Hero Girls: Legends of Atlantis	Aquaman	Direct-to-video	
2018	The Seven Deadly Sins the Movie: Prisoners of the Sky	King	Netflix film	
2019	Reign of the Supermen	Jimmy Olsen	Direct-to-video	
2020	NiNoKuni	Yusuke Ninomiya	Netflix film	
2020	Curious George: Go West, Go Wild!	Emmett	Direct-to-video	
2021	The Seven Deadly Sins: Cursed by Light	King		
2022	Teen Titans Go! & DC Super Hero Girls: Mayhem in the Multiverse	Superman	Direct-to-video	
2022	The Seven Deadly Sins: Grudge of Edinburgh Part 1	King		
2023	Black Clover: Sword of the Wizard King	Nacht		
2023	Ladybug & Cat Noir: The Movie	Plagg	Netflix film	
2023	The Seven Deadly Sins: Grudge of Edinburgh Part 2	King		
2024	Maboroshi	Masamune Kikuiri	Lead role; Netflix film	
2024	Mobile Suit Gundam SEED Freedom	Kira Yamato	Lead role	
2024	The Wild Robot	Weasel 2	Credited as Max Mittleman	
2025	A Chuck E. Cheese Christmas	Additional voices		
2026	Cosmic Princess Kaguya!	Akira Mikado	Netflix film	
2026	Batman: Knightfall	Robin / Jason Todd, Cop	Direct-to-video	

=== Shorts ===
List of voice performances in shorts
Year	Title	Role	Notes	Source
2026	Chuck E. Cheese Minisodes	Chuck E. Cheese		
2026	How Not To Draw	Bobby	Episode: "Bobby & Romy Help the Animator Fight an Evil Force"	

=== Video games ===
List of voice performances in video games
Year	Title	Role	Notes	Source
2014	Atelier Escha & Logy: Alchemists of the Dusk Sky	Logix "Logy" Fiscario	Co-protagonist; also Atelier Escha & Logy Plus	
2014	Diablo III: Reaper of Souls	Rayeld the Hunter, Crazed Hermit		
2014	Smite	Vicious Apollo		
2014	Sunset Overdrive	Scout		
2015	Skylanders: SuperChargers	Panderghast, Thundertow		
2015	Stella Glow	Rusty		
2015	Halo 5: Guardians	Rooker (RKR 1206–5), Promethean Captain		
2015	Lego Dimensions	Billy Peltzer, Jack Harmon, Flamey Ghost, Brand		
2015	Fallout 4	Zeke, Brendan Volkert, Northy		
2015	StarCraft II: Legacy of the Void	Stone		
2015	Star Wars Battlefront	Quarren		
2016	Fire Emblem Fates	Leo, Forrest, Kaden		
2016	Mirror's Edge Catalyst	Kuma		
2016	Star Ocean: Integrity and Faithlessness	Fidel Camuze		
2016	Shin Megami Tensei IV: Apocalypse	Hallelujah		
2016	Naruto Shippuden: Ultimate Ninja Storm 4	Konohamaru Sarutobi (adult)	Road to Boruto	
2016	The Legend of Heroes: Trails of Cold Steel II	McBurn, Lechter Arundel		
2016	World of Warcraft: Legion	Prince Farondis		
2016	World of Final Fantasy	Deathskull		
2016	Skylanders: Imaginators	Pandergast		
2017	Persona 5	Ryuji Sakamoto		
2017	Atelier Shallie: Alchemists of the Dusk Sea	Logix "Logy" Ficsario	Plus/DX versions only	
2017	Kingdom Hearts HD 2.8 Final Chapter Prologue	Luxu	Kingdom Hearts χ Backcover movie	
2017	Nier: Automata	Additional voices		
2017	Fire Emblem Heroes	Gordin, Leo, Gray, Kaden, Forrest		
2017	Agents of Mayhem	Pride Trooper		
2017	Tales of Berseria	Shigure Rangetsu		
2017	Fire Emblem Echoes: Shadows of Valentia	Gray		
2017	Star Wars Battlefront II	Quarren		
2018	Valkyria Chronicles 4	Claude Wallace		
2018	Octopath Traveler	Additional voices		
2018	Lego DC Super-Villains	Jimmy Olsen		
2018	Spyro: Reignited Trilogy	Various voices		
2018	Persona 5: Dancing in Starlight	Ryuji Sakamoto		
2019	Super Smash Bros. Ultimate	Ryuji Sakamoto	Joker DLC	
2019	Catherine: Full Body	Ryuji Sakamoto		
2019	Judgment	Seiya		
2019	Code Vein	Louis		
2019	The Legend of Heroes: Trails of Cold Steel III	McBurn, Lechter Arundel		
2019	Daemon X Machina	Zoa		
2019	Borderlands 3	Troy Calypso		
2019	Death Stranding	The Paleontologist		
2019–22	Star Wars: The Old Republic	Arn Peralun		
2020	One-Punch Man: A Hero Nobody Knows	Saitama		
2020	Persona 5 Royal	Ryuji Sakamoto		
2020	Final Fantasy VII Remake	Red XIII		
2020	Ninjala	Burton		
2020	Grounded	Pete		
2020	Bugsnax	Filbo Fiddlepie		
2021	Fortnite Battle Royale	The Predator		
2021	Persona 5 Strikers	Ryuji Sakamoto		
2021	Ratchet & Clank: Rift Apart	Additional voices		
2021	No More Heroes III	Damon Riccitiello		
2021	Cookie Run: Kingdom	Red Velvet Cookie, Aurora Candy Cookie		
2021	Demon Slayer: Kimetsu no Yaiba – The Hinokami Chronicles	Sabito		
2021-25	Genshin Impact	Arataki Itto		
2022	Ghostwire: Tokyo	Ed		
2022	Saints Row	Player Voice 1		
2022	Star Ocean: The Divine Force	Albaird Bergholm		
2022	Tactics Ogre: Reborn	Denam Pavel		
2023	Anonymous;Code	Pollon Takaoka		
2023	The Legend of Heroes: Trails into Reverie	McBurn, Lechter Arundel		
2023	Naruto x Boruto: Ultimate Ninja Storm Connections	Konohamaru Sarutobi (adult)		
2023	Persona 5 Tactica	Ryuji Sakamoto		
2024	Final Fantasy VII Rebirth	Red XIII		
2024	Demon Slayer: Kimetsu no Yaiba – Sweep the Board	Sabito		
2025	Lunar Remastered Collection	Alex		In-game credits
2025	Rune Factory: Guardians of Azuma	Watarase		
2025	Date Everything!	Jean Loo, Michael, Mr. Cluckles, Mikey		
2027	Final Fantasy VII Revelation	Red XIII		

=== Live-action ===
List of acting performances in film and television
Year	Title	Role	Notes	Source
2014	Two and a Half Men	Mechanical Demon (voice)	Episode: "The Ol' Mexican Spinach"	
2015	The Big Bang Theory	Tech Support	Episode: "The Graduation Transmission"	
