= Peter Piper Pizza =

American pizza chain

Peter Piper Pizza, LLC
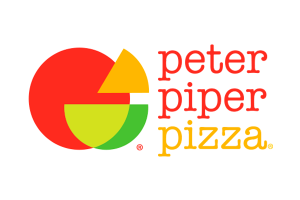
- Trade name: Peter Piper Pizza
- Company type: Subsidiary
- Industry: Pizzeria; Restaurant; Family entertainment center
- Founded: 1973; 53 years ago Glendale, Arizona, U.S.
- Founder: Anthony M. "Tony" Cavolo
- Headquarters: Phoenix, Arizona, U.S.
- Number of locations: 98 (2026)
- Area served: United States, Mexico
- Key people: Randy Forsythe (president); Jim Brawley (COO); Genaro Perez (CMO)
- Products: Pizza; Chicken wings; Cheesy bread
- Services: Arcade games; Birthday parties; Kiddie rides
- Owner: Venture West Group (1992–2007); ACON Investments (2007–2014); Queso Holdings, Inc. (2014–2020); Monarch Alternative Capital (2020–Present)
- Parent: CEC Entertainment, Inc. (2014–2020); CEC Entertainment, LLC. (2020–present)
- Website: peterpiperpizza.com

Peter Piper Pizza, LLC (stylized as peter piper pizza) is an American pizza and entertainment company with locations in Arizona, California, New Mexico, and Texas, and Mexico.

It is a wholly owned subsidiary of CEC Entertainment LLC, making it the sister restaurant chain to Chuck E. Cheese. CEC's lenders, led by Monarch Alternative Capital, acquired CEC in 2020.

== History ==
Anthony "Tony" Cavolo founded Peter Piper Pizza in Arizona in 1973. The first Peter Piper opened in Glendale, Arizona. There are 98 restaurants in the United States and Mexico. In 1995, Peter Piper acquired its hometown competitor Pistol Pete's Pizza. They were independent until 1992, when Peter Piper Inc. was acquired by The Venture West Group. The company was sold again to ACON Investments in 2007.

Apollo Global Management, owners of CEC Entertainment, Inc., the parent company of the Chuck E. Cheese restaurant chain, acquired the company in October 2014. CEC Entertainment, Inc., Peter Piper Pizza's parent company, filed for bankruptcy in 2020 due to the significant financial strain brought on by the COVID-19 pandemic. CEC Entertainment emerged from bankruptcy in December under the ownership of its lenders, led by Monarch Alternative Capital.

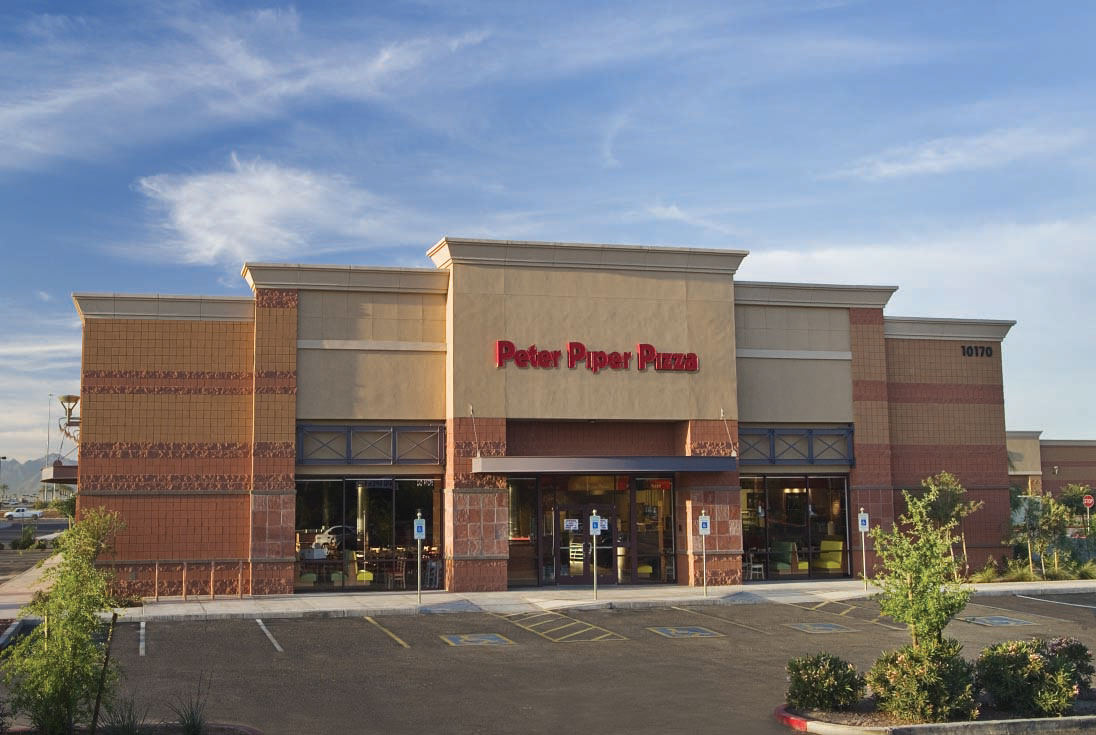
Peter Piper Pizza in Avondale, Arizona

In March 2014, Peter Piper Pizza redesigned its logo utilizing a serif font face following an abstract design. The new logo was created by WD Partners as part of an effort "to connect with Gen X and Millennial parents." The updated design was widely panned.

In February 2022, a new take-out version of Peter Piper Pizza, known as "Peter Piper Pizza Express" opened in Phoenix, Arizona. This version removes the dining rooms and arcades seen in the standard Peter Piper restaurants. A second location would open in Phoenix in June 2022. A third location would open in Tucson, Arizona between 2022 and 2023.

In March 2023, a new fast-casual version of Peter Piper Pizza known as "Peter Piper Pizzeria" opened in Olathe, Kansas. A second location opened in Kansas City, Missouri in June 2023. Both locations would close by June 2024, with the Kansas City location being converted into a Chuck E. Cheese location.
