= Toa Yukinari =

Japanese voice actress

- 行成 とあ
- Born: 11 May; Nagasaki Prefecture, Japan
- Occupation: Voice actress
- Years active: 2010–present
- Employer: Arts Vision
- Notable work: Berserk as Casca; Mobile Suit Gundam Thunderbolt as Claudia Palh; Grand Blue Dreaming as Azusa Hamaoka

Toa Yukinari (行成 とあ, Yukinari Toa; born 11 May) is a Japanese voice actress from Nagasaki Prefecture, affiliated with Arts Vision. She is known for starring as Casca in Berserk, Claudia Palh in Mobile Suit Gundam Thunderbolt, and Azusa Hamaoka in Grand Blue Dreaming.

== Biography ==
Toa Yukinari, a native of Nagasaki Prefecture, was born on 11 May. A member of her high school's broadcasting club, she originally considered a voice acting career when she saw a magazine advertisement for the Japan Narration Actor Institute, but instead enrolled as a nursing student in junior college after graduating high school. After graduating, she enrolled in the institute, taking classes there three times a week.

After doing voices for Naruto, Nichijou, and Steins;Gate, Yukinari voiced Casca in the Berserk: The Golden Age Arc trilogy (2012-2013) and reprised her role in the 2016 Berserk sequel series. She later starred as Claudia Palh in Mobile Suit Gundam Thunderbolt and Azusa Hamaoka in Grand Blue Dreaming. She also played Maria Celeste at Galileo to Musume Celeste: Galileo Bōenkyō kara no 400-nen, an exhibition at the Mukai Chiaki Children's Science Museum in Tatebayashi, Gunma.

Yukinari also works in rōdoku-geki. During high school, she was a national finalist in rōdoku-geki. In May 2024, it was announced that she would star as Emmaline in Brilliant Hotels: Luxurious Reading Theater at Yamano Hall in Shibuya, Tokyo.

== Filmography ==
=== Animated television ===
Year	Title	Role(s)	Ref
2010	Karl to Fushigi-na Tō		
2010	Naruto: Shippuden	Akane	
2011	Nichijou		
2011	Steins;Gate	Mother	
2012	Space Brothers	Fumi Aotake, Alan, Linda Clif	
2014	Log Horizon	Mizufa Trude	
2014	Riddle Story of Devil	Sorami Azuma	
2016	Berserk	Casca	
2016	Haven't You Heard? I'm Sakamoto		
2016	Naruto: Shippuden	Karin	
2017	Boruto: Naruto Next Generations	Karin	
2018	Cells at Work!	NK Cell	
2018	Grand Blue Dreaming	Azusa Hamaoka	
2018	JoJo's Bizarre Adventure: Golden Wind		
2020	Yashahime	Kamaitachi	
2021	Battle Game in 5 Seconds	Rin Kashii	
2022	Birdie Wing	Rose Aleon	
2024	Wonderful Pretty Cure!	Inuzuka	
2025	Orb: On the Movements of the Earth	Jolenta (adult)	
2026	Smoking Behind the Supermarket with You	Gotō	

=== Original net animation (ONA) ===
Year	Title	Role(s)	Ref
2024	Terminator Zero	Eiko	

=== Animated film ===
Year	Title	Role(s)	Ref
2012	Berserk: The Golden Age Arc	Casca	
2019	Grisaia: Phantom Trigger	Ichiru Sengoku	

=== Original net animation ===
Year	Title	Role(s)	Ref
2015	Mobile Suit Gundam Thunderbolt	Claudia Palh	

=== Video games ===
Year	Title	Role(s)	Ref
2012	Assassin's Creed III: Liberation	Élise Lafleur	
2012	BlazBlue: Chrono Phantasma	Bullet	
2012	Professor Layton vs. Phoenix Wright: Ace Attorney	Jodora	
2016	Apex Legends	Ash	
2016	Quiz RPG: The World of Mystic Wiz	Ruriageha	
2021	Cookie Run: Kingdom	Hollyberry Cookie	
2022	Mario + Rabbids Sparks of Hope	Edge	
2024	Concord	Kyps	
2024	Stellar Blade	Raven	
2024	Life Is Strange: Double Exposure	Safiya Llewellyn-Fayyad	

=== Dubbing ===
- The Fall Guy (Venti Kushner)
- Superman (Angela Spica / The Engineer)
