= Mobile Suit Gundam Thunderbolt =

Japanese manga series

- First tankōbon volume cover

機動戦士ガンダム サンダーボルト (Kidō Senshi Gandamu Sandāboruto)
- Genre: Adventure; Mecha; Military science fiction
- Created by: Hajime Yatate; Yoshiyuki Tomino
- Manga
- Written by: Yasuo Ohtagaki
- Published by: Shogakukan
- English publisher: NA: Viz Media; SG: Shogakukan Asia
- Magazine: Big Comic Superior
- Original run: 23 March 2012 – 26 September 2025
- Volumes: 27
- Original net animation
- Directed by: Kō Matsuo
- Written by: Kō Matsuo
- Music by: Naruyoshi Kikuchi
- Studio: Sunrise
- Licensed by: NA: Sunrise
- Released: 25 December 2015 – 14 July 2017
- Runtime: 15−20 minutes
- Episodes: 8
- Anime film

Mobile Suit Gundam Thunderbolt: December Sky
- Directed by: Kō Matsuo
- Written by: Kō Matsuo
- Music by: Naruyoshi Kikuchi
- Studio: Sunrise
- Licensed by: AUS: Madman Entertainment; NA: Sunrise
- Released: 25 June 2016
- Runtime: 71 minutes
- Anime film

Mobile Suit Gundam Thunderbolt: Bandit Flower
- Directed by: Kō Matsuo
- Written by: Kō Matsuo
- Music by: Naruyoshi Kikuchi
- Studio: Sunrise
- Licensed by: AUS: Madman Entertainment; NA: Sunrise
- Released: 18 November 2017
- Runtime: 89 minutes
- icon

Mobile Suit Gundam Thunderbolt (Japanese: 機動戦士ガンダム サンダーボルト, Hepburn: Kidō Senshi Gandamu Sandāboruto) is a Japanese manga series written and illustrated by Yasuo Ohtagaki. It was serialized in Shogakukan's seinen manga magazine Big Comic Superior from March 2012 to September 2025, with its chapters collected in 27 tankōbon volumes. Set in the Universal Century era, the manga presents an alternate "world line" that diverges from the official timeline established in Mobile Suit Gundam. The manga is licensed in English Viz Media in North America and by Shogakukan Asia in Southeast Asia.

An original net animation (ONA) series adaptation by Sunrise was released between December 2015 and April 2016. A second part was released between March and July 2017. Each part was re-edited into a theatrical compilation film: December Sky (June 2016) and Bandit Flower (November 2017). The series is distinguished within the franchise by its high-detail mechanical artwork, a jazz score supervised by Naruyoshi Kikuchi, and a mature, stylistically bold tone.

By December 2025, the manga had over 6 million copies in circulation.

== Plot ==
The series takes place concurrently with Mobile Suit Gundam, during the One Year War but is not canonical to the original anime. In U.C. 0079, the Earth Federation's Moore Brotherhood and the Principality of Zeon's Living Dead Division engage in a fierce battle in the "Thunderbolt Sector" (サンダーボルト宙域, Sandāboruto Chū-iki), a shoal zone littered with debris from destroyed space colonies, named for its frequent electrical discharges. Since the outbreak of the war, Zeon forces have secured the Thunderbolt Sector as it is a vital supply route to the Zeon-aligned A Baoa Qu asteroid fortress. The story focuses on Federation soldier Io Fleming as he battles Zeon's best sniper, Daryl Lorenz.

== Characters ==
=== Earth Federation ===
==== Moore Brotherhood ====
The Moore Brotherhood (ムーア同胞団, Mūa Dōhō-dan) is an Earth Federation squadron consisting of former residents of the space colonies of Side 4: Moore, with the intent of punishing the Principality of Zeon for destroying their homeland.

Io Fleming (イオ・フレミング, Io Furemingu)
Voiced by: Yuichi Nakamura (Japanese); Max Mittelman (English)
Io Fleming is a Federation ensign and mobile suit pilot known for playing free jazz over his radio during combat. Before the One Year War, he competed in air racing events on Side 4 with friends Claudia Peer and Cornelius Qaqa. After his father, Side 4's mayor, dies during the war's outbreak, Io joins the Moore Brotherhood fleet. During a mission in the Thunderbolt Sector, he commandeers a Zeon Rick Dom and later pilots the Full Armor Gundam against the Living Dead Division. Captured and beaten, he escapes during the Battle of A Baoa Qu. Seven months post-war, he pilots the RX-78AL Atlas Gundam aboard the Spartan.
Claudia Peer (クローディア・ペール, Kurōdia Pēru)
Voiced by: Toa Yukinari (Japanese); Cherami Leigh (English)
Captain of the Beehive. Claudia finds her position uneasy, especially with Io as her lover. She is further disgusted when the Earth Federation sends teenage pilots to her fleet as reinforcements. The war takes a huge toll on her, as she resorts to taking depressant drugs before Io snaps her out of an overdose. During the last leg of the Moore Brotherhood's operation, her fleet is destroyed and she is shot by her XO Graham, who blames her and the Brotherhood elites for the death of his family. Eight months after the One Year War, Claudia is revealed to have survived the gunshot and is currently a commander in the South Seas Alliance.
Cornelius Kaka (コーネリアス・カカ, Kōneriasu Kaka)
Voiced by: Daisuke Hirakawa (Japanese); Christian La Monte (English)
An engineer aboard the Beehive and Io's best friend. As Io seemingly has an allergic reaction that causes him to sneeze in the hangar, Cornelius often lends him a pack of tissues. Following the events of the One Year War, Cornelius is reassigned to the Spartan as the ship's engineer.
Graham (グラハム, Guraham)
Voiced by: Shunsuke Sakuya (Japanese); Ray Chase (English)
A Federation XO aboard the Beehive. He is uncomfortable with serving under Claudia. After the Beehive is severely damaged by the Psycho Zaku, Graham shoots Claudia before he is consumed by the ship's final explosion.

==== Spartan crew ====
The Spartan (スパルタン, Suparutan) is a Pegasus-class warship that serves as the protagonists' base in the series' second season.

Bianca Carlyle (ビアンカ・カーライル, Bianka Kārairu)
Voiced by: Yurina Furukawa
A Federation Ensign who initially pilots an RGM-79 GM during Operation Star One. After the One Year War, she is assigned the Guncannon Aqua aboard the Spartan. Like Io, Bianca is a jazz enthusiast. She sports several tattoos on her body that represent her numerous battles during and after the One Year War.
Vincent Pike (ビンセント・パイク, Binsento Paiku)
Voiced by: Tomokazu Sugita
Captain of the Spartan.
Monica Humphrey (モニカ・ハンフリー, Monika Hanfurī)
Voiced by: Sayuri Sadaoka
A Federation Captain aboard the Spartan. During Operation Star One, she led a special forces team to capture the Flanagan Institute labs and acquire Zeon's psycommu technology.

==== Earth Federation Forces ====
Barclay (バークレー, Bākurē)
Voiced by: Kenji Nomura
An ace Core Fighter pilot.
Josh (ジョシュ, Josshu)
Voiced by: Toshiharu Nakanishi
Meg Reihm (メグ・リーム, Megu Rīmu)
Voiced by: Rina Satō
A bridge operator aboard the Spartan. She is ranked as a Sergeant in the Federation Army.
Alicia (アリシア, Arishia)
Voiced by: Kaori Ishihara
A rookie mobile suit pilot. She is ranked as a Sergeant in the Federation Army.
Sonia (ソニア)
Voiced by: Saori Onishi
A Guntank pilot in a Federation Special Forces unit. She is ranked as a Lieutenant in the Federation Army.
Creed (クリード, Kurīdo)
Voiced by: Kazuya Nakai
Leader of a Federation Special Forces unit.

=== Principality of Zeon ===
==== Living Dead Division ====
The Living Dead Division (リビング・デッド師団, Ribingu Deddo Shidan) is a Principality of Zeon squadron made of amputee pilots fitted with metal prosthetic limbs. The division is assigned to defend the Thunderbolt Sector from the Federation.

Daryl Lorenz (ダリル・ローレンツ, Dariru Rōrentsu)
Voiced by: Ryohei Kimura (Japanese); Johnny Yong Bosch (English)
Daryl Lorenz is a Zeon Chief Petty Officer and ace sniper who carries a vintage radio playing oldies music. During the early stages of the One Year War, he loses his legs to mortar fire in a colony raid. While fighting Io Fleming in the Thunderbolt Sector, his Zaku I is destroyed, costing him his left hand. To better interface with the experimental Psycho Zaku, he voluntarily amputates his right hand. After a fierce battle with the Full Armor Gundam, he escapes and later receives a Gelgoog, though his prosthetics hinder its operation. Post-war, he joins a Zeon remnant group in the South Pacific.
Karla Mitchum (カーラ・ミッチャム, Kāra Mitchamu)
Voiced by: Sayaka Ohara (Japanese); Tara Sands (English)
Karla Mitchum is a Zeon scientist involved in the Reuse P. Device (リユース・P・デバイス, Riyūsu Pī Debaisu) project, developing prosthetics for the Living Dead Division. Hoping to secure her dissident father's release, she serves Zeon with dedication. After Io Fleming kills pilot Hoover, she urges Daryl Lorenz to retaliate. Traumatized after witnessing allies die during the Dried Fish's destruction, she falls into a catatonic state. She awakens post-war, but her mental state regresses to adolescence due to the psychological toll.
J. J. Sexton (J・J・セクストン, Jei Jei Sekusuton)
Voiced by: Hiroshi Tsuchida (Japanese); Will Barrett (English)
A Zeon scientist in charge of the RPD project. He treats the Living Dead Division pilots as lab rats. During the evacuation of the Dried Fish, Sexton sneaks through a pile of injured soldiers and jumps into an escape pod. He was later seen as a member of the South Seas Alliance.
Burroughs (バロウズ, Barousu)
Voiced by: Mutsumi Sasaki (Japanese); Scott Williams (English)
Captain of the Dried Fish, the Living Dead Division's flagship. Like the division's pilots, Burroughs is an amputee, sporting a prosthetic right arm. He and his main crew are killed after the Full Armor Gundam fires at the Dried Fish's bridge.
Sean Mitadera (ショーン・ミタデラ, Shōn Mitadera)
Voiced by: Shinya Hamazoe (Japanese); Ivan Nemer (English)
A Zaku pilot with prosthetic arms. He is seemingly killed by Io when the latter uses his Zaku as a shield against Daryl, but in fact survives and relocates to Earth after the war concludes, working as a member of an independent salvage company.
Hoover (フーバー, Fūbā)
Voiced by: Kent Itō (Japanese); Jamison Boaz (English)
A Rick Dom pilot with a prosthetic left arm, he is described by Daryl as a "playboy-wannabe". Hoover is shot in the head by Io, who then hijacks his Rick Dom to leak the Living Dead Division's sniper positions to the Moore Brotherhood.
Fisher Ness (フィッシャー・ネス, Fisshā Nesu)
Voiced by: Ryōsuke Morita (Japanese); Chris Jai Alex (English)
A Rick Dom pilot with prosthetic legs. During the final battle between the Moore Brotherhood and the Living Dead Division, he retreats to rendezvous with Zeon reinforcements to rescue his comrades. Fisher and Daryl become part of a Zeon Remnant army in the South Pacific after the One Year War.
Layton (レイトン, Reiton)
Voiced by: Shuuhei Iwase (Japanese); Todd Haberkorn (English)
A Gattle pilot and Daryl's close friend. After firing a direct hit on the Beehive with a Big Gun, he is killed by the Moore Brotherhood fleet's countering fire.
Keith Meyers (キース・マイヤーズ, Kīsu Maiyāzu)
Voiced by: Hiroshi Murata (Japanese); Wayne Grayson (English)
Denver Roche (デンバー・ローチ, Denbā Rōchi)
Voiced by: Keisuke Kōmoto (Japanese); Daniel J. Edwards (English)
A Zeon soldier who wears a black face mask and has a prosthetic leg. During the Moore Brotherhood's takeover of the Dried Fish, Denver detonates a suicide bomb in the vessel's armory.

==== Zeon Remnants ====
Billy Hickam (ビリー・ヒッカム, Birī Hikkamu)
Voiced by: Ryōta Ōsaka (Japanese); Todd Haberkorn (English)
A Zeon Newtype pilot who served during the last days of the One Year War and is part of the Zeon Remnant army alongside Daryl and Fisher.
Sebastian Morse (セバスチャン・モース, Sebaschan Mōsu)
Voiced by: Yōji Ueda
A Zeon Acguy pilot.
Phillip Kaufman (フィリップ・カウフマン, Firippu Kaufuman)
Voiced by: Takaya Kuroda
A Zeon Gogg pilot and a crew member aboard the submarine Mad Angler (マッド・アングラー, Maddo Angurā).
Bull (ブル, Buru)
Voiced by: Kenichirou Matsuda (Japanese); Beau Billingslea (English)
A Grublo mobile armor pilot and baseball enthusiast who collects bobbleheads of baseball players. During the Antarctica skirmish, Bull faces the Atlas Gundam underwater. Despite heavily damaging his opponent, he is defeated by the Gundam's agility, and his mobile armor is crushed by the pressure of the deep sea.

=== South Seas Alliance ===
The South Seas Alliance (南洋同盟, Nan'yō Dōmei) is a Buddhist radical cult faction aligned with the Earth Federation until U.C. 0080, when it calls for independence. Its military consists primarily of mobile suits cobbled together from Federation and Zeon units from the One Year War. Intelligence reports reveal that the South Sea Alliance possesses the remains of Daryl's Psycho Zaku and plans to mass-produce its Reuse P. Device technology.

Levan Fuu (レヴァン・フウ, Revuan Fū)
The Reverend and leader of the South Seas Alliance. He was once a test child for the Principality of Zeon to develop the perfect Newtype until the experiments damaged his brain. Following the One Year War, he converted to Buddhism and used his Newtype abilities to create his cult.
Chow Ming (チャウ・ミン, Chau Min)
Voiced by: Rie Takahashi
A Gouf pilot in the South Seas Alliance.

== Production ==
In November 2011, Yasuo Ohtagaki announced that he would put his other manga series, Moonlight Mile, on hiatus to start a new project, which was later revealed to be a (originally planned) Gundam mini-series. Mobile Suit Gundam Thunderbolt started in Shogakukan's seinen manga magazine Big Comic Superior magazine on 23 March 2012.

Ohtagaki described the manga as a realistic war story for adults, employing a harsh tone, mechanical realism, and a jazz motif that dictates its rhythm and atmosphere. His goal was to create a work "adult fans can empathize with", using cinematic techniques for pacing and sound on the page. The series was later stated to occupy its own separate "worldline", distinct from the main Universal Century canon.

In September 2018, it was announced that Ohtagaki would place the manga on hiatus due to tenosynovitis. Upon its return in December, he announced a permanent change to his drawing style to accommodate the condition in his dominant left hand, acknowledging that this might affect the series' visual quality and receive a mixed response from fans; the manga has had other hiatuses since then. In June 2025, it was announced that the manga would end in eight chapters. The series finished on 26 September 2025.

== Media ==
=== Manga ===
Written and illustrated by Yasuo Ohtagaki, Mobile Suit Gundam Thunderbolt was serialized in Shogakukan's seinen manga magazine Big Comic Superior magazine from 23 March 2012 to 27 September 2025. Shogakukan collected its chapters in 27 tankōbon volumes, released from 30 October 2012 to 19 December 2025.

The series is licensed for English release in Southeast Asia by Shogakukan Asia, which released the first volume on 22 April 2015. North American publisher Viz Media announced its English-language license at Anime Expo in July 2016; the first volume was released on 15 November of that same year.

==== Volumes ====
No.	Original release date	Original ISBN	English release date	English ISBN
1	30 October 2012	978-4-09-184810-9	22 April 2015 (SEA); 15 November 2016 (NA)	978-981-09-4369-1 (SEA); 978-1-4215-9055-4 (NA)
2	30 May 2013	978-4-09-185307-3	27 May 2015 (SEA); 21 February 2017 (NA)	978-981-09-4370-7 (SEA); 978-1-4215-9260-2 (NA)
3	28 February 2014	978-4-09-186080-4	22 July 2015 (SEA); 16 May 2017 (NA)	978-981-09-4371-4 (SEA); 978-1-4215-9261-9 (NA)
4	28 November 2014	978-4-09-186718-6	April 2016 (SEA); 15 August 2017 (NA)	978-981-09-4372-1 (SEA); 978-1-4215-9302-9 (NA)
5	27 February 2015	978-4-09-186855-8	21 November 2017 (NA)	978-1-4215-9303-6
6	30 October 2015	978-4-09-187269-2	20 February 2018 (NA)	978-1-4215-9304-3
7	25 December 2015	978-4-09-187538-9	15 May 2018 (NA)	978-1-4215-9505-4
8	24 July 2016	978-4-09-187705-5	21 August 2018 (NA)	978-1-4215-9506-1
9	30 January 2017	978-4-09-189446-5	20 November 2018 (NA)	978-1-4215-9915-1
10	30 August 2017	978-4-09-189634-6	19 February 2019 (NA)	978-1-9747-0107-0
11	28 February 2018	978-4-09-189851-7	21 May 2019 (NA)	978-1-9747-0646-4
12	30 July 2018	978-4-09-860092-2	20 August 2019 (NA)	978-1-9747-0746-1
13	26 April 2019	978-4-09-860332-9	18 February 2020 (NA)	978-1-9747-1198-7
14	30 August 2019	978-4-09-860425-8	21 July 2020 (NA)	978-1-9747-1532-9
15	28 February 2020	978-4-09-860585-9	19 January 2021 (NA)	978-1-9747-2072-9
16	30 September 2020	978-4-09-860739-6	17 August 2021 (NA)	978-1-9747-2295-2
17	26 February 2021	978-4-09-861007-5	15 February 2022 (NA)	978-1-9747-2653-0
18	30 September 2021	978-4-09-861164-5	18 October 2022 (NA)	978-1-9747-3248-7
19	28 February 2022	978-4-09-861284-0	21 March 2023 (NA)	978-1-9747-3616-4
20	30 September 2022	978-4-09-861449-3	21 November 2023 (NA)	978-1-9747-4044-4
21	28 February 2023	978-4-09-861621-3	19 March 2024 (NA)	978-1-9747-4373-5
22	30 August 2023	978-4-09-862578-9	19 November 2024 (NA)	978-1-9747-4932-4
23	29 February 2024	978-4-09-862578-9	20 May 2025 (NA)	978-1-9747-5496-0
24	30 July 2024	978-4-09-863048-6	16 September 2025 (NA)	978-1-9747-5292-8
25	28 February 2025	978-4-09-863373-9	17 March 2026 (NA)	978-1-9747-6096-1
26	29 August 2025	978-4-09-863603-7	15 September 2026 (NA)	978-1-9747-6647-5
27	19 December 2025	978-4-09-863816-1	16 March 2027 (NA)	978-1-9747-6917-9

=== Original net animation ===
A four-episode original net animation adaptation, produced by Sunrise, was announced in October 2015. Directed and written by Kō Matsuo, it features character designs by Hirotoshi Takaya, mechanical designs by Morifumi Naka, Seiichi Nakatani, and Hajime Katoki, and a score by jazz musician Naruyoshi Kikuchi. It premiered as a pay-per-view in Japan on 25 December 2015 (with early access for the Gundam Fan Club on 11 December), concluding on 22 April 2016 (with early access for the Gundam Fan Club on 8 December). A second four-episode season was announced in November 2016. The episodes were released from 24 March to 14 July 2017.

Matsuo and producer Naohiro Ogata discussed the adaptation's aims and rollout, while Kikuchi and Matsuo explained their musical concept: Io Fleming is associated with modern, often violent free jazz to power battle scenes, while Daryl Lorenz is contrasted with "oldies" vocals. Creator Yasuo Ohtagaki added that he wanted songs to convey character feeling beyond dialogue.

==== Episodes ====
No.	Directed by	Storyboarded by	Original release date
Part 1
1	Kou Matsuo	Kou Matsuo	25 December 2015
The Moore Brotherhood's Beehive flagship launches a squadron of GMs across the Thunderbolt Sector to break through the Principality of Zeon's defenses, only to be shot down by the Living Dead Division and their Big Gun units. Io Fleming, who manages to eject from his GM, guns down a Rick Dom pilot before commandeering the mobile suit and returning to the Beehive with the sniper location data. He is then assigned to pilot the new Full Armor Gundam prototype, which he uses to flush out three Big Gun units. Living Dead Division ace sniper Daryl Lorenz vows to avenge his fallen comrades and kill Io.
2	Shunichi Yoshizawa	Iwao Teraoka	12 February 2016
During the Full Armor Gundam's second sortie in the Thunderbolt Sector, Io once again confronts Daryl. Daryl narrowly escapes after throwing a Cracker grenade at the Gundam, but he loses his left hand in the process. As the Living Dead Division is desperate to hasten the Reuse P. Device project to combat the Gundam, Daryl has his right hand amputated so that his body will have full control of the experimental Psycho Zaku.
3	Shinya Watada	Hajime Katoki	18 March 2016
The Moore Brotherhood receives reinforcements from the Earth Federation, but the new mobile suit pilots are young teenagers, much to Io's chagrin. Feeling the pressure of the war, Claudia resorts to drugs before Io snaps her out of an overdose. Io leads the young cadets to break through the Living Dead Division's final defenses and attack the Dried Fish, but the battle becomes a massacre due to the young pilots' inexperience. Meanwhile, Daryl's Psycho Zaku ambushes and destroys the Beehive squadron, with Claudia assumed to have perished in the battle. Seeing that Daryl was not present in the defense of the Dried Fish, Io runs off to confront him.
4	Kou Matsuo	Kou Matsuo	22 April 2016
With both sides suffering massive casualties, the Full Armor Gundam engages in a final showdown with the Psycho Zaku. Meanwhile, the surviving members of the Moore Brotherhood board the Dried Fish to take it over, but the remaining members of the Living Dead Division refuse to be taken prisoner and plan to self-destruct the vessel along with everyone on board. The Federation survivors manage to neutralize the Zeon crew and seize the Dried Fish, while Io and Daryl's battle results in heavy damage to both of their mobile suits. A Zeon reinforcement fleet then arrives and captures Io and the Federation survivors while rescuing any remaining Living Dead members.
Part 2
5	Kou Matsuo	Kou Matsuo	24 March 2017
During the Earth Federation's assault on the Zeon's A Baoa Qu fortress, Io and his comrades escape captivity while several Zeon forces retreat, taking Io's Gundam with them. Eight months after the end of the One Year War, the Federation continues to battle Zeon remnants on Earth. The Federation carrier Spartan enters Earth orbit, but a Musai-class ship launches its Komusai shuttle for a kamikaze run on it. Suddenly, a new Gundam piloted by Io, the Atlas Gundam, is launched from below and it slices the Komusai in half to save the Spartan.
6	Kou Matsuo	Kou Matsuo	28 April 2017
The South Seas Alliance, a Buddhist radical cult faction of the Federation, plots to declare itself independent. Furthermore, it is discovered that they possess the Reuse P. Device technology of Daryl's Psycho Zaku. The Spartan is assigned to track and destroy the Psycho Zaku before the South Seas Alliance can mass-produce the technology. In Antarctica, Bianca's squadron is ambushed by Zeon mobile suits. Io sorties in the Atlas Gundam and dispatches the enemy units before facing a Grublo mobile armor. The battle sends both units far too deep underwater and Io with his equipment lost slowly sinks to the bottom of the sea, but Bianca in her damaged Guncannon Aqua lifts him back to the surface.
7	Shunichi Yoshizawa	Kou Matsuo & Nobuhiko Genma	31 May 2017
Due to the emotional trauma Karla suffered during the One Year War, her mind has regressed to that of an adolescent child with the Zeon Remnants now trying to take care of her in hopes of her adult mind to recover. Daryl's Acguy squadron heads to a South Seas Alliance-controlled city in Southeast Asia to retrieve a spy, but their cover is blown and they must fend off the island's mobile suits. Meanwhile, the Spartan is confronted by a South Seas Alliance mobile suit squadron, with Io's former commander and lover Claudia leading them.
8	Kou Matsuo	Kou Matsuo & Nobuhiko Genma	14 July 2017
Tensions flare between the Spartan and the South Seas Alliance which results in a full on battle while Daryl's team is also having trouble in their hands finding their way out against a counterattack by the cult group. During the battle, several cultists break into the Spartan while Daryl manages to extract the Zeon spy out of the island. Meanwhile, Io and Bianca storm through the squadron of Dodai YS units to take back Claudia, but they are thwarted by Gouf pilot Chow Ming. The cultists boarding the Spartan are quickly repelled, but not before passing an item to a spy. Despite the temporary victory, Io learns that the leader of the South Seas Alliance, Levan Fuu, is a Newtype using his powers to brainwash his followers.

==== Compilation films ====
A director's cut edition of the first season, titled Mobile Suit Gundam Thunderbolt: December Sky (機動戦士ガンダム サンダーボルト DECEMBER SKY, Kidō Senshi Gandamu Sandāboruto Dissenbā Sukai), was screened at selected 15 theaters in Japan from 25 June 2016 for a limited time of two weeks. A first-press "Complete Edition" Blu-ray/DVD set was available at screenings, with a regular edition following in stores on 29 July; A theatrical compilation film of the second season, titled Mobile Suit Gundam Thunderbolt: Bandit Flower (機動戦士ガンダム サンダーボルト BANDIT FLOWER, Kidō Senshi Gandamu Sandāboruto Banditto Furawā), was screened in Japanese theaters between 18 November and 1 December 2017.

An English dub from NYAV Post was included on the December Sky Blu-ray; Right Stuf released an import edition on 5 July 2016. The film's English dub was screened at Tokyo's Shinjuku Piccadilly theater on 15 August 2016, as part of the annual Sunrise Festival. The inaugural Anime NYC convention hosted the second film's premiere screening on 19 November 2017.

== Reception ==
By February 2025, the Mobile Suit Gundam Thunderbolt manga had sold over 5.5 million copies. By December 2025, it had over 6 million copies in circulation.

The anime film compilations were praised for their audiovisual quality and bold tonal approach. Forbes characterized December Sky as a great but quite dark film that appealed to fans of the franchise's grittier elements, and described Bandit Flower as impressively animated, noting its Blu-ray release effectively highlighted its visual and musical strengths. Anime UK News similarly lauded December Sky as an exciting and emotionally powerful war film with exceptional action and music.

The magazine-style portal AnimeHack highlighted the intentional musical contrast between Daryl's oldies and Io's aggressive free jazz, noting that this created an emotional counterpoint and heightened the intensity of the battle scenes during the film's opening night event.

Preceded by Mobile Suit Gundam: Iron-Blooded Orphans	Gundam metaseries (production order); 2015–2016	Succeeded by Gundam Build Fighters Try: Island Wars
Preceded by Mobile Suit Gundam	Gundam Universal Century timeline U.C. 0079–0080	Succeeded by Mobile Suit Gundam: The 08th MS Team; Mobile Suit Gundam: Requiem for Vengeance; Mobile Suit Gundam 0080: War in the Pocket
