= Chuck E. Cheese in the Galaxy 5000 =

- VHS cover
- Directed by: David Orr
- Written by: Neil Bligh
- Produced by: Gen Fukunaga; Cindy Fukunaga; Executive: Gen Fukunaga; Jon Rice; Daniel Cocanougher; Associate: Barry Watson
- Starring: Galen Beyea; Duncan Brannan; Georgia Denney; Jeremy Blaido; Christopher Sabat
- Cinematography: David Orr
- Music by: Dave Butler; David Rennke; Mark Lovrich
- Production company: CEC Entertainment, Inc.
- Distributed by: FUNimation Productions
- Release date: October 5, 1999
- Running time: 62 minutes
- Country: United States
- Language: English

Chuck E. Cheese in the Galaxy 5000 is a 1999 American direct-to-video film that features the mascot characters from the Chuck E. Cheese chain of family entertainment centers. It was released on October 5, 1999, in Chuck E. Cheese locations and also sold at Target stores. The plot is that a boy named Charlie Rockit needs $50,000 to fix his aunt and uncle's tractor engine, so Chuck E. Cheese and his friends go to the Galaxy 5000 to win it in a race.

== Plot ==
The film stars Chuck E. Cheese and his friends, Helen Henny, Jasper T. Jowls, Mr. Munch and Chef Pasqually.

During a day at Pasqually's diner, Chuck E. is visited by his friend Charlie Rockit, whose aunt and uncle are in danger of losing their farm because they need $50,000 to replace their broken tractor. To Pasqually's suggestion, Chuck E. decides to raise the money by racing in an intergalactic race called the Galaxy 5000 on the Planet Orion, where the grand prize is the exact amount of money needed.

Using Pasqually's Awesome Adventure Machine, Chuck E., Helen, Jasper, Munch, and Charlie teleport to Planet Orion where Chuck E. is presented a run-down spacecraft called the Songbird, which gets fixed and tuned-up with the help of Pasqually's old co-pilot and mechanic, Flapjack. Among the racers are the X-Pilots Peter and Ivan, the race's champions who want nothing to do with them and are suspected of cheating, and a woman named Astrid whom Chuck E. falls in love with, making Helen jealous and left out. In the qualifying round, the X-Pilots inhale an energy-boosting substance called Zoom Gas before achieving a speed of Vega-2 which leaves the Songbird in the dust; when Chuck E. attempts at it, he loses control at the final stretch through Dead Man's Canyon, and the team ends up finishing last. Later during Chuck E. and Astrid's date at the Soda Shop, Helen shows up with the X-Pilots alongside her, making it look like she has betrayed him as they mock his loss, not knowing she was really going undercover to expose their cheating. Helen is then brought to the X-Pilots' captain Dr. Zoom, who reveals the X-Pilots have cheated every year by using the Zoom Gas to help them see better while achieving Vega-2 speeds, which is produced by juicifying captive chickens, and locks up Helen as his mass-producing victim.

The night before the Galaxy 5000, Chuck E. goes for a practice flight alone for another attempt at Vega-2, but loses control again and ends up crashing into the underground home of a cave-dwelling hermit named Harry, who bears a resemblance to Pasqually back home. With Chuck E. feeling nothing is going right, Harry reveals he didn't do any training before the qualifiers and was unprepared, so he helps Chuck E. learn how to believe in himself to win while helping him train for the race, while Helen manages to break out of her cage along with the other chickens, knocking out Dr. Zoom in return. On the day of the final race, Astrid reveals she never liked Chuck E. as he thought and was only interested in the prize money, betraying his team for the X-Pilots. Just before the race begins, Chuck E. returns in time for everyone to tell him the truth, and Helen also rejoins the team and apologizes to Chuck E. for her supposed betrayal, and the two reconcile.

During the final race, Chuck E. was successful at achieving Vega-2, but the X-Pilots cheat again and send the Songbird back into last place, getting lost in the Black Forest and going off-course as a result. Through the encouragement of his teammates and what he learned from Harry, Chuck E. faces his fears and overcomes all his self-doubts, achieving the highest speed possible, Vega-3 and manages to overtake the X-Pilots at the final stretch and crosses the finish line. After winning the prize money which he shares with Charlie, Dr. Zoom and the X-Pilots are arrested for their Zoom Gas scheme and taken into custody, while Astrid shuns them and leaves them in disgrace. Chuck E. embraces his newly discovered teamwork and the true help of his friends and everyone sings and dances to celebrate his victory as the film ends.

== Cast ==
=== Live-action cast ===
- Galen Beyea as Charlie Rockit
- Stephen Lange as Pasqually, Harry the Hermit
  - Michael McFarland as Harry the Hermit (singing voice)
- Don Shook as Flapjack
- Jon Rice, Chris Cason, Gary Frank and Mike Hawes as Reporters
- Chris Nash, Jerry Patin, Josh Cosimo and Gen Fukunaga as Policemen
- Chris Sabat as Piano Player
- The Morris Brothers as Soda Shop Stage Dancers
- Kenyon Holmes as Peter
- Rob Flanagan as Ivan
- Jackson Kane as Dr. Zoom
  - Neil Bligh as Dr. Zoom (singing voice)
- Lydia Mackay as Astrid
- Johnathon Vought as Pizza Guy
- Candace Bordelon, Tim Conkey, Andrew DeLuma, Ron Cyphers, Josh Olkowski, Angie Guerrero, Terri Shaw, Alice Guidry, Samantha Sutherland, Jacquelyn Sutherland, Taylour Smith, Becky Taylor, Sonya Sui and Stevie Webb as Dancers

=== Voice cast ===
- Duncan Brannan as Chuck E. Cheese
- Georgia Denney as Helen Henny
  - Heather Garner as Helen Henny (singing voice for "The Real Me")
- Jeremy Blaido as Jasper T. Jowls
- Chris Sabat as Mr. Munch, Announcer, Narrator

=== Suit performers ===
- Peyton Welch and Daphne Gere as Chuck E. Cheese
- Georgia Denney and Linda Coleman as Helen Henny
- Micah Menikos and Shay Coldwell as Jasper T. Jowls
- Chris Cason and Reny Fulton as Mr. Munch

== Songs ==
- "The Galaxy's for You and Me" – Duncan Brannan, Georgia Denney
- "The Real Me" – Heather Garner
- "Snowball's Chance in Texas" – Jeremy Blaido
- "Zoom Gas" – Neil Bligh
- "True Potential" – Michael McFarland
- "I Know I Can" – Duncan Brannan, Jeremy Blaido, Chris Sabat, Georgia Denney, Michael McFarland
- "We Did It" – Duncan Brannan, Georgia Denney, Jeremy Blaido, Chris Sabat
- "A Little Help from Above" – Ashley Seekatz, Brett Cline
