= Duncan Brannan =

American voice actor

- Born: Fort Worth, Texas, U.S.
- Occupations: Voice actor; writer; teacher; minister
- Years active: 1993–present
- Spouse: Ralana Lynn Gregg (m. 1993)
- Children: 2

Duncan Brannan is an American voice actor, who has provided voices for numerous mainstream children's entertainment characters, English-language dubs of Japanese anime, and other commercial properties. He is mainly known for being the voice of Chuck E. Cheese, the titular mascot of the Chuck E. Cheese entertainment restaurant chain from 1993 to 2012.

== Career ==
Brannan was the voice of Chuck E. Cheese in restaurant chains across the U.S., as well as his English and Spanish voice in national commercials seen on PBS, Nickelodeon, and other places from late 1993 to April 2012. He was replaced by musician and singer Jaret Reddick when Chuck E. Cheese’s revamped their image. Brannan is also known for voicing Barney the Dinosaur on the children's television series Barney & Friends from 1997 to 2002, usually filling in for Bob West (who's also voiced Chuck E. Cheese characters), the usual voice of Barney, for home video releases, toys, and other media, as well as providing Barney’s singing voice for the main series. Ironically, Chuck E. Cheese was a sponsor to Barney & Friends at the time as well as other PBS programs such as Arthur and Clifford the Big Red Dog.

Brannan has also voiced commercials and industrials for secular and religious markets. Some of his most notable credits are: Taco Bueno, Martha Stewart, Just Brakes, The Department of Defence, Brinker's International (for Chili's, Maggiano's, On the Border, and Romano's Macaroni Grill), Methodist Health Systems, Leslie's Pool Supplies, Cambien Voyager, New Horizons, Stop Her Now, K Havnanian Homes, First United Bank, Campus Crusade for Christ, Chuck Swindoll, Lone Star College System, Parkland Health and Hospital Systems, JPI Realtors, Eddie Eagle & the Wing Team, Okratron 5000, and Funimation, Inc.

Outside of voice acting, Brannan also works as a writer, artist, consultant, and pastor.

== Personal life ==
He currently resides in Fort Worth, Texas with his wife Ralana Lynn Gregg, whom he married on January 2, 1993. Together they have two daughters, Kaydra and Karlisa Brannan.

== Filmography ==
Year	Title	Role	Notes
1998	It's Time for Counting	Barney (speaking voice)	Direct-to-video; Voice actor workprints; Uncredited.
1998	My Party with Barney	Barney (voice)	Direct-to-video film created by Kideo (Note: He spoked some of his dialogue during the scenes after It's Time for Counting, Bob West has returned to speak and sing songs in his personalized video.)
1999	Chuck E. Cheese in the Galaxy 5000	Chuck E. Cheese (voice)	Direct-to-video
1999	More Barney Songs	Barney (speaking/additional voice)	Direct-to-video; Voice actor workprints; Uncredited in episodes 14-20 (Note: In the final draft, Bob West has dubbed over Brannan's lines in the last 7 episodes from November 20–28, 1997.)
2000	Barney's Super Singing Circus	Barney (voice)	Direct-to-video
2000	Come on Over to Barney's House	Barney (voice)	Direct-to-video
2001	Barney: Let's Go to the Zoo	Barney (voice)	Direct-to-video
2002	Barney: You Can Be Anything	Barney (voice)	Direct-to-video
2002	Barney: Let's Go to the Beach!	Barney (voice)	Direct-to-video
2002	Barney: Fun on Wheels	Barney (voice)	Direct-to-video

=== Television ===
Year	Title	Role	Notes
1997–2002	Barney & Friends	Barney the Dinosaur (speaking voice)	Voice actor workprints Uncredited in episodes 14-20 (Note: In the final draft, Bob West has dubbed over Brannan's lines from November 20, 1997 to April 10, 1998.)

=== Anime ===
Year	Title	Role	Notes
1993–1995	Dragon Ball Z	Babidi / Sharpner / Smitty / Commander / Old Man	45 episodes
1994	Yu Yu Hakusho: Ghost Files	Shogo Sato	3 episodes
1995	Dragon Ball	Monster Carrot	Episode: "Usagi oyabun no tokui-waza"
1995	Dragon Ball Z: Wrath of the Dragon	Sharpner	Film
1995–2003	Dragon Ball	Pamput / Ninja Marasaki / Fighter / Monster Carrot	11 episodes
1996–1997	Detective Conan	Oswald Burny / Ken Tomason	2 episodes
1996–2002	Dragon Ball GT	Dr. Myuu / Scholar Bot / Zoonama / Babidi	16 episodes
1999	Blue Gender	Man #1	Episode: "Priority"
2000–2011	One Piece	Mr. 3 / Sarquiss / Major Inspector Shepherd / Additional Voices	28 episodes
2001	Baki the Grappler	Takagi	Episode: "The Right to Fight"
2001–2003	Dragon Ball Z	Babidi / Sharpner / Smitty / Commander / Old Man	45 episodes
2003	Kiddy Grade	Additional Voices	Credited as Duncan Brennan
2003	The Galaxy Railways	Guy Sander	3 episodes
2004	Fullmetal Alchemist	Additional Voices / Number 48 / Younger Slicer Brother	4 episodes
2004	Samurai 7	Shichiroji	21 episodes
2005	The Detective Memoirs of Chief Straw Hat Luffy	Mr. 3	TV movie
2006	Mushi-Shi	Extra	Episode: "White in the Ink Slab"
2006	Jyu oh sei	Third	9 episodes
2006	Love and Honor	Hori / Senior Chief	Film
2007	Darker Than Black	Jean	2 episodes
2007	Vexille	SWORD Comm Officer 2	Film
2007	Evangelion: 1.0 You Are (Not) Alone	Additional Voices	Film
2007	Baccano!	Denkuro	Episode: "Everything Began on Board the Advena Avis"
2007–2009	Dragonaut: The Resonance	Kasuga Nozaki	14 episodes
2008	Gunslinger Girl: Il Teatrino	Bernardo	2 episodes
2008	Soul Eater	Additional Voices	Episode: "Shakunetsu no Bôsou Tokkyû! Dai ma dôshi ga nokoshita ma dôgu?"
2008	Casshern Sins	Additional Voices	2 episodes
2009	Linebarrels of Iron	Additional Voices	2 episodes
2009	Eden of the East the Movie I: The King of Eden	Additional Voices	Film
2009–2010	Tenchi Muyo! War on Geminar	Dagmyer	13 episodes
2009–2010	Fullmetal Alchemist: Brotherhood	Additional Voices / Fox / Number 48 / Younger Slicer Brother	8 episodes
2010	Trigun: Badlands Rumble	Additional Voices	Film
2010	Black Butler	Priest	Episode: "Teroshitsuji"
2011	Fractale	Additional Voices	4 episodes
2011	Deadman Wonderland	Additional Voices	Episode: "Death Row Inmate"
2011	Gekijouban Sengoku Basara: The Last Party	Additional Voices	Film
2011	Appleseed XIII: Tartaros	Additional Voices	Film
2011	Appleseed XIII: Ouranos	Additional Voices	Film
2011	Last Exile: Gin'yoku no Fam	Luscinia	5 episodes
2011	Future Diary	Additional Voices	2 episodes
2011	Appleseed XIII	Additional Voices	13 episodes
2011–2012	Fairy Tail	Sugarboy	16 episodes
2012	Eureka Seven: Ao	Nakamura	9 episodes
2012	Good Luck Girl!	Additional Voices / Genjuro	2 episodes
2013	Karneval	Additional Voices / Murano	2 episodes
2013	Ghost in the Shell: Arise – Border 1: Ghost Pain	Additional Voices	Film
2013–2014	Tokyo Ravens	Additional Voices	5 episodes
2013–2020	Attack on Titan	Thomas Wagner	4 episodes
2014	Noragami	Additional Voices	Episode: "Over the Line"
2014	Ping Pong the Animation	Additional Voices	4 episodes
2014	Free!	Sugimoto	Episode: "Stroke of an Unexpected Meeting!"
2014	Tokyo Ghoul	Additional Voices	Episode: "Cloudburst"
2014	Tokyo ESP	Additional Voices	4 episodes
2014	One Piece: 3D2Y – Overcome Ace's Death! Luffy's Vow to His Friends	Mr. 3	TV movie
2014	Barakamon	Kawafuji / Additional Voices	10 episodes
2014	Laughing Under the Clouds	Additional Voices	Episode: "Three Brothers, Standing Under the Clouds"
2014	Riddle Story of Devil	Additional Voices	2 episodes
2014–2015	Dragon Ball Z Kai	Sharpener / Babidi	8 episodes
2015	Tokyo Ghoul: Root A	Additional Voices	Episode: "Hangman"
2015	The Rolling Girls	Ma-Bo	2 episodes
2015	Ninja Slayer	Offender	Episode: "Born in Red Black"
2015	The Boy and the Beast	Additional Voices	Film
2015	Snow White with the Red Hair	Brecker	2 episodes
2015	The Empire of Corpses	Additional Voices	Film
2015	Kekkai Sensen	Additional Voices / Elder	7 episodes
2015	Attack on Titan: Junior High	Thomas Wagner	12 episodes
2015	Owari no serafu	Norito Goshi	9 episodes
2016	Handa-kun	Takao Kawafuji	12 episodes
2018	One Piece: Episode of Skypeia	Additional Voices	TV movie
2018	Hinomaru Sumo	Additional Voices	4 episodes
2018	That Time I Got Reincarnated as a Slime	Additional Voices	Episode: "Gabiru Is Here"
2018–2019	A Certain Magical Index	Tatemiya / Additional Voices	6 episodes
2019	Magical Girl Special Ops Asuka	Additional Voices	Episode: "The Magical Girl Comes Back"
2019	Gorgeous Butterfly: Young Nobunaga	Nobuhiro	Episode: "Coming of Age"
2019	One Piece: Stampede	Galdino	Film
2019	Arifureta: From Commonplace to World's Strongest	Additional Voices / Walla: Students	2 episodes
2019	Ensemble Stars	Male Student 08B	Episode: "Episode #1.8"
2019	BEM	Additional Voices	Episode: "Chimera"
2019	Yu-No: A Girl Who Chants Love at the Bound of this World	Additional Voices	2 episodes
2019	Black Clover	Digit	3 episodes
2019	Africa no Salaryman	Additional Voices	6 episodes
2019	Stand My Heroes: Piece of Truth	Additional Voices	Episode: "PIECE 2"
2025	Dragon Ball Daima	Babidi	

=== Video games ===
Year	Title	Role	Notes
2003	Dragon Ball Z: Budokai 2	Babidi	Credited as Duncan Brennan
2004	Dragon Ball Z: Budokai 3	Babidi	
2005	Dragon Ball Z: Sagas	Red Ribbon Army	
2008	Dragon Ball Z: Infinite World	Babidi	
2009	Dragon Ball: Revenge of King Piccolo	Murasaki	
2014	Smite		
2020	Dragon Ball Z: Kakarot	Babidi / Sharpener	

=== Other work ===
Year	Title	Role	Notes
1993–2012	Chuck E. Cheese's	Chuck E. Cheese (1994–2012), Jasper T. Jowls (1994, 1996), Mr. Munch (1994, 1996–1999), Pasqually P. Pieplate (1996, 1999), Larry the Technician (1993–1998, 2012)	Animatronic stage show and show segments
