= Chuck E. Cheese =

American entertainment restaurant chain

- Logo used since 2019
- Trade name: CEC Entertainment
- Formerly: Chuck E. Cheese's Pizza Time Theatre (1977–1984); ShowBiz Pizza (1986–1990); Chuck E. Cheese's Pizza (1986–1994); Chuck E. Cheese's (1994–2017); Chuck E. Cheese Pizzeria and Games (2017–2019)
- Type: Subsidiary
- Traded as: Nasdaq: CHKY (1981–1984); Nasdaq: SHBZ (1989–1998); NYSE: CEC (1998–2014)
- Industry: Pizzeria; Restaurant; Family entertainment center; Franchising
- Predecessor: Pizza Time Theatre, Inc.
- Founded: May 17, 1977; 49 years ago San Jose, California, United States
- Founder: Nolan Bushnell; Gene Landrum
- Headquarters: Irving, Texas, United States
- Number of locations: 677
- Area served: Africa, Asia, Europe, North America, South America, Australia
- Key people: Gene Landrum (original president and COO); Scott Drake (president and CEO)
- Products: Pizza; Chicken wings French fries
- Brands: Chuck's Arcade
- Services: Arcade games Birthday parties Kiddie rides Obstacle courses Trampolines; Animatronic shows
- Owner: Brock Hotel Corporation (1985–1988); Queso Holdings, Inc. (2014–2020); Monarch Alternative Capital (2020–Present)
- Parent: Atari, Inc. (1977–1978); Pizza Time Theatre, Inc. (1978–1985); ShowBiz Pizza Time, Inc. (1985–1998); CEC Entertainment, Inc. (1998–2020); CEC Entertainment, LLC (2020–present)
- Subsidiaries: Peter Piper, LLC
- Website: chuckecheese.com

Chuck E. Cheese (formerly known as Chuck E. Cheese's Pizza Time Theatre, Chuck E. Cheese's Pizza, and simply Chuck E. Cheese's) is an American entertainment restaurant chain headquartered in Irving, Texas. In addition to serving pizza and other food items, the chain features arcade games, amusement rides, and musical shows; former mainstays included ball pits, crawl tubes, and animatronic shows. The chain's name is taken from its main character and mascot, Chuck E. Cheese. The first location opened as Chuck E. Cheese's Pizza Time Theatre in San Jose, California in 1977. Chuck E. Cheese was the first family restaurant to integrate food with arcade games and animated entertainment, making it a pioneer of the "family entertainment center" concept.

After filing for bankruptcy in 1984, Pizza Time Theatre was acquired in May 1985 by Brock Hotel Corporation, the parent company of competitor ShowBiz Pizza Place. Following the acquisition, ShowBiz Pizza Place, Inc. was renamed to ShowBiz Pizza Time, Inc., which began unifying the two brands in 1990, renaming every location to Chuck E. Cheese's Pizza. It was later shortened to Chuck E. Cheese's in 1994 and Chuck E. Cheese in 2019. The parent company, ShowBiz Pizza Time, also became CEC Entertainment in 1998.

== History ==
=== Pizza Time Theatre ===
Chuck E. Cheese's Pizza Time Theatre was founded by Atari, Inc. co-founder Nolan Bushnell, who sought to expand arcades beyond adult locations like pool halls to family-friendly venues. His experience in the amusement park industry, as well as his fondness for the Enchanted Tiki Room and the Country Bear Jamboree at Disneyland, influenced his concept for Pizza Time Theatre. He said, "It was my pet project ... I chose pizza because of the wait time and the build schedule—very few components, and not too many ways to screw it up".

Prior to founding Atari, Bushnell would drive around the Bay Area with Atari co-founder Ted Dabney, looking at different pizza parlors and restaurants to brainstorm concepts. "Chuck E. Cheese was always [Nolan's] passion project, even before Atari was a thing," said Dabney. "He wanted to start a business of family-friendly restaurants with amusement park midway games. I think initially it made no fiscal sense, so he shelved it for a while, but then when Atari took off, he had the means to pursue it, plus a built-in distribution model for Atari's new releases".

When his first animatronic show was being assembled, Bushnell learned that the costume he had bought for his main character, a coyote, was actually a rat, prompting him to suggest changing the name from "Coyote Pizza" to "Rick Rat's Pizza". The marketing team believed that this name would not be appealing to customers, and proposed "Chuck E. Cheese" instead. The company adopted the rat as their mascot.

The first Chuck E. Cheese's Pizza Time Theatre opened in San Jose, California, on May 17, 1977. In 1978, when Atari's then-corporate parent Warner Communications refused to open additional locations, Bushnell purchased the rights to the concept and characters from Warner for $500,000. Gene Landrum then resigned from Atari and was made the chain's president and chief operating officer. By the end of December 1979, there were seven PTT locations: six in California and one in Nevada (Sparks). Its "Cyberamics" animatronics were produced fully in-house by PTT employees.

=== ShowBiz Pizza Place ===
To expand beyond California and the west coast, Bushnell began to franchise, resulting in a co-development agreement between himself and Robert Brock of Topeka Inn Management in June 1979. The agreement handed Brock exclusive franchising rights for opening Pizza Time Theatres in sixteen states across the Southern and Midwestern United States, while also forming a company subdivision, "Pizza Show Biz", to develop the Pizza Time Theatres.

Late in 1979, Brock became aware of Aaron Fechter of Creative Engineering, Inc. and his work in animatronics. In November 1979, he scouted Fechter's business and concluded that Creative Engineering's animatronics would be too strong a competition for Bushnell's work. Brock therefore requested that Bushnell release him from their co-development agreement, wishing to develop with Fechter instead.

In December 1979, Brock and Fechter formed ShowBiz Pizza Place Inc., and Brock gave notice to sever his development relationship with Bushnell. ShowBiz Pizza Place was conceptually identical to Pizza Time Theatre in all aspects except for animation, which would be provided by Creative Engineering. ShowBiz Pizza Place opened its first location on March 3, 1980, in Kansas City, Missouri.

Upon the opening of ShowBiz Pizza Place, Bushnell sued Brock and Topeka Inn Management over a breach of contract. Brock immediately issued a counter-suit against Bushnell, citing misrepresentation. The court case began in March 1980, and the courts ruled in favor of Bushnell after he successfully argued that ShowBiz was imitating his unique concepts. The ruling forced Brock to pay Bushnell a percentage of annual revenues from the first 160 locations he opened. Topeka Inn Management later changed its name to Brock Hotel Corporation, and moved its headquarters to Irving, Texas in 1982. Both restaurants experienced increased success as the video game industry became more robust. To maintain competition, both franchises continually modified and diversified their animatronic shows.

=== Decline, bankruptcy, and merger ===
Pizza Time Theatre went public in 1981. Unlike ShowBiz, Pizza Time focused less on food quality, which was being offered at premium prices. The company placed more attention on the video game aspect of the business, but the popularity of arcades was beginning to decline in the United States. As a result, Pizza Time's revenues began to fall by the end of 1982. The video game market crashed in 1983, and by the middle of the year, Pizza Time was operating in the red. Bushnell's debts became insurmountable, and Pizza Time Theatre Inc. filed for Chapter 11 bankruptcy on March 28, 1984, reporting a loss of $58 million incurred in 1983.

The floundering company was then purchased by Brock in May 1985, merging the two restaurant companies into ShowBiz Pizza Time Inc. Both restaurant chains continued to operate under their respective titles, while major financial restructuring had begun.

In January 1989, ShowBiz Pizza Time became a public company, trading on Nasdaq with the ticker symbol SHBZ. Beginning in June 1990, ShowBiz restaurants began converting their stage shows and rebranding their storefronts to Chuck E. Cheese's Pizza. By September 1990, Creative Engineering officially cut ties with SPT. By 1994, all ShowBiz restaurants had rebranded into Chuck E. Cheese's restaurants. The name was then shortened to Chuck E. Cheese's by March 1994 after a redesigned concept.

During the mid-1990s, the character Chuck E. Cheese began to see significant design changes. His vest (or tuxedo suit) and derby hat were changed for a baseball cap, casual shirt, and optional sneakers in an attempt to appeal to a younger audience.

In 1998, ShowBiz Pizza Time renamed itself CEC Entertainment, Inc. to reflect the remaining chain brand, alongside moving their stock to the NYSE with the ticker symbol CEC. CEC Entertainment has since acquired additional family restaurant properties, including 13 locations of the now-defunct Discovery Zone in 1999, and all locations of Peter Piper Pizza in October 2014; Peter Piper Pizza still operates under that name.

=== International expansion ===
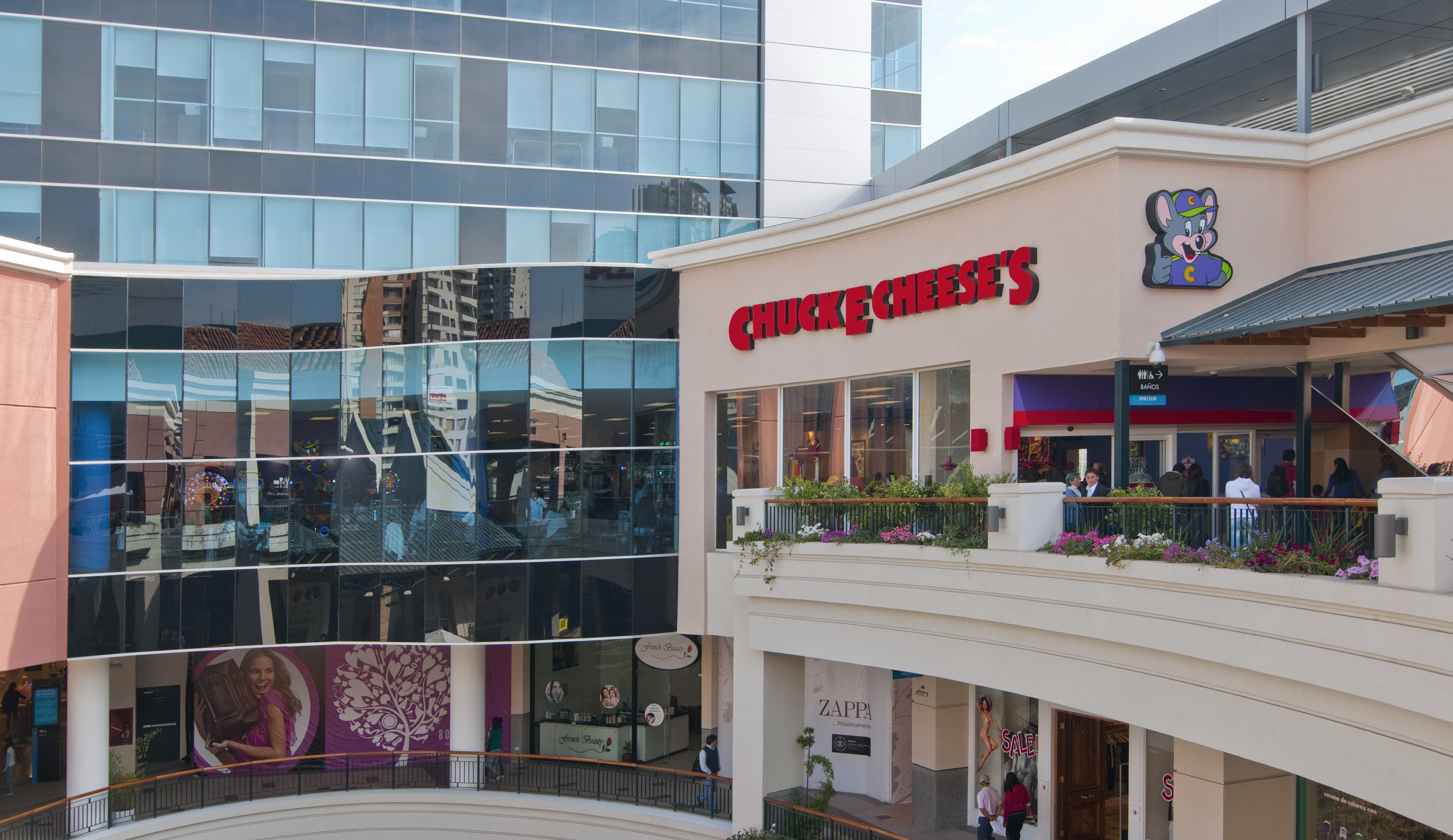
Chuck E. Cheese's Boulevard Marina in Viña del Mar, Chile, 2011

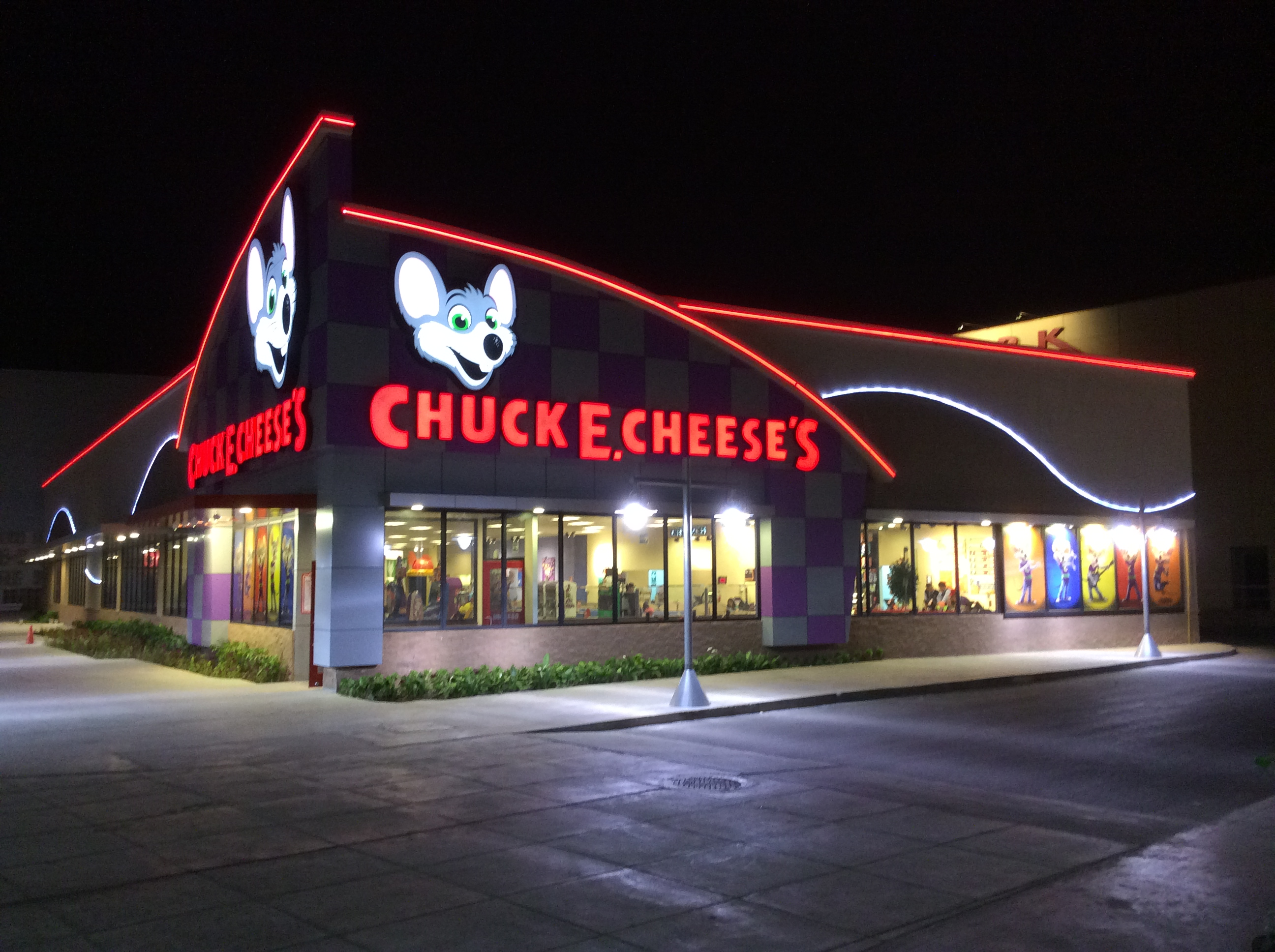
Chuck E. Cheese's Mallplaza in Trujillo, Peru, 2014

In 1981, the restaurant opened its first international franchise in Australia under the name Charlie Cheese's Pizza Playhouse. The name change had to do with the common meaning of the word "chuck", which in Australia is a reference to the phrase "to throw up". The first location, located in Surfer's Paradise, Queensland, relocated in 1982 to a location in Carina, Queensland, which closed by the mid-1980s. In January 2024, it was announced that Chuck E. Cheese would be making its return to Australia with a multi-unit franchise partnership with Royale Hospitality Group. In March 2025, it was announced that the first location would open in Perth, Western Australia. In August 2025, the franchise announced the location would be opening in Joondalup, a suburb of Perth, on September 6, 2025.

Pizza Time Theatre, Inc. also opened at least one restaurant in British Hong Kong and Singapore, which both closed shortly thereafter as a result of the initial company's 1984 bankruptcy. Two locations in Puerto Rico franchised by Santa Rosa Enterprises would open in 1983: one in San Juan, Condado in September of that year, and one in the Santa Rosa Mall in Bayamón would open in either November or December of that year. Both stores would be short-lived and would approximately close by the end of 1985. Pizza Time Theatre also opened a location in Creteil, France in 1984 and planned to open a location in Ealing, England in the mid-1980s, but the plan failed. In December 2024, it was announced that Chuck E. Cheese would be making its official debut in the United Kingdom with target cities including Glasgow, Scotland, Manchester, England, and Bristol, England.

In 1994, nine years after ShowBiz Pizza Time was formed, the first new international location would open in Lo Barnechea, Santiago, Chile. More restaurants would open in the country, with 13 total stores as of 2023. In the late 1990s, there was a plan to expand to Israel, 1998 saw the plan of expanding to Japan, first opening in Tokyo. These never materialized. An expansion for the Philippines was planned, and the first location would have opened by 2000. However, these plans (like Pizza Time Theatre's plans for future expansion) never materialized. In the Middle East, locations would open in Saudi Arabia beginning in 2001, the United Arab Emirates in 2008, Jordan in 2019, Bahrain in 2021, Qatar in 2022, and Kuwait in 2024. Three new locations would open in Puerto Rico between 2003 and 2008. Another plan to open in the Glorietta mall complex of Makati City, Philippines, was greenlit in January 2013, but also failed to materialize.

On March 6, 2012, the first Chuck E. Cheese's in Mexico would officially open in Monterrey. "Ratón Chito", an unofficial character, previously represented Chuck E. in the country during the 1980s. This unique incarnation appeared throughout the ShowBiz (and later Boomis) Pizza Fiesta chain of establishments, conceived as a result of closing Pizza Time Theatres in the United States. Assets from several store closures were shipped to the Mexican franchisees, with the intention of retrofitting the Pizza Time Players to better suit the country's market demographic. Sally Industries of Jacksonville provided the controller equipment for these retrofits, as the animatronics arrived without their original control systems required for operation. The Ratón Chito aspect of ShowBiz Pizza Fiesta was later spun off into Boomis, separating itself from the rest of the company. These stores managed to successfully remain in operation until the 2000s, with one in Aguascalientes auctioning off equipment (including the retrofitted Chuck E. Cheese animatronics) as late as October 2018.

In August 2022, it was announced that the first Chuck E. Cheese in Egypt would open in Sheik Zayed's Royal Mall, with the location opening in February 2024.

In February 2023, a third Chuck E. Cheese location opened in Port of Spain, Trinidad & Tobago, after the Chaguanas location in 2014, and the San Fernando location in 2016, although the San Fernando location closed sometime in January 2023. At the time of the Port of Spain opening, Chuck E. Cheese had planned additional international locations to open in Jamaica in late 2023, Guyana in 2024, and another in Jamaica by 2025.

In December 2024, CEC Entertainment announced the first Chuck E. Cheese in Guyana would open in a multi-unit franchise agreement.

In March 2025, the first Chuck E. Cheese opened in the Dominican Republic, located within the Sambil Mall in Santo Domingo. The franchisee is Leo Castellon, who also operates locations in Honduras and El Salvador.

As of August 2025, CEC Entertainment owns and operates approximately 465 Chuck E. Cheese locations in the United States and Canada, with 96 franchised locations in the US, Puerto Rico, and 16 countries around the world, as well as 96 Peter Piper Pizza restaurants in the US, and 13 in Mexico. The company's locations are located in 45 states domestically and in 16 foreign countries and territories around the world. As of 2025, franchising is only available for markets outside of the United States.

=== Buyout and modern redesign ===
By late 2011, CEC was struggling with decreasing revenue. They hired Dallas-based advertising agency The Richards Group to head a rebranding campaign, changing the Chuck E. Cheese mascot into a slimmer rockstar mouse who plays electric guitar. Voice actor Duncan Brannan, who had characterized Chuck E. as a hip and young mouse for 18 years, was replaced with Jaret Reddick, frontman and guitarist of the pop punk band Bowling for Soup. Richards Group creative director Bill Cochran knew Reddick from improv comedy and liked Bowling for Soup, so the character was being built around Reddick's personality and voice before he knew he was chosen as the voice of Chuck E. For the rebrand, they hired animation companies Reel FX Creative Studios and Little Zoo Studio to animate the Chuck E. Cheese character in CGI as opposed to the 2D animation used for previous commercials. The rebrand campaign, titled "Chuck E. Rocks", would officially launch on July 5, 2012, to negative reception from the public and fans.

In February 2014, Apollo Global Management acquired CEC Entertainment, Inc. for $54 per share, or about $950 million. In October 2014, under Apollo Global Management, CEC Entertainment announced that they would purchase their Phoenix-based competitor Peter Piper Pizza from ACON Investments.

In August 2017, the company began to pilot a new design concept at seven remodelled locations (three in Kansas City, three in San Antonio, one in Selma, Texas), branded as Chuck E. Cheese Pizzeria & Games (also known as the Chuck E. Cheese 2.0 remodel by fans). These locations feature more upscale decor with a "muted" interior color scheme, an open kitchen, the "Play Pass" card system to replace arcade tokens, and the animatronic stage show replaced by a dance floor area. These changes, along with expansions to food offerings, were intended to help the chain be more appealing to adults and encourage family dining as opposed to primarily hosting parties.

In 2019, the company announced it would go public on the New York Stock Exchange through Leo Holdings Corporation, a shell company of which Apollo would still own 51%. Bloomberg also reported that after going public, Chuck E. Cheese would no longer have animatronics as part of the entertainment. The proposed merger between CEC Entertainment and Leo Holdings Corporation was terminated on July 29, 2019.

=== Financial trouble and second bankruptcy ===
The COVID-19 pandemic had been financially damaging to the parent company during 2020, and with an estimated $1–2 billion in debt, the possibility exists of all CEC properties being forced to close if bankruptcy refinancing fails. CEC Entertainment solicited $200 million in loans to finance a restructuring under bankruptcy protection. CEC Entertainment and its subsidiaries also filed a voluntary petition under Chapter 11 of the Bankruptcy Code in the United States Bankruptcy Court for the Southern District of Texas on June 24, 2020. On December 30, 2020, CEC Entertainment, Inc., the owners of Chuck E. Cheese and Peter Piper Pizza chains, emerged from bankruptcy under the ownership and selling of its lenders led by Monarch Alternative Capital, reorganized under CEC Entertainment Holdings, LLC. On January 16, 2021, the Bankruptcy Court closed 15 of 16 of the affiliate debtor's cases, while future matters of each debtor would be administered and heard in CEC Entertainment Holdings, LLC Chapter 11 case.

=== Post-bankruptcy and new concepts ===
In April 2023, the company began testing a small trampoline zone for children at its location in Brooklyn, New York. As of 2024, it is installed in most of the company-owned United States and Canada locations.

In June 2024, the company began testing a small obstacle course called the "Ninja Run" at the location in Grand Prairie, Texas. Beginning in 2025, it would be installed in more locations in the US.

In August 2024, the company announced a national tiered membership program.

In September 2024, Chuck E. Cheese introduced a new concept at the Trumbull Mall, called Fun Spot Arcade. Fun Spot Arcade was described by officials as a mall arcade chain that would be "an exciting opportunity to expand beyond games for kids and offer experiences that appeal to a broader audience, including teens and young adults."

In April 2025, the company announced that all 125 of its active play areas would be renamed from "Ninja Run" to "Chuck E.'s Superhero Playground".

In May 2025, the company announced the launch of its "CEC Media Network", a digital out-of-home network featured in its venues.

In June 2025, the company announced the launch of Chuck's Arcade, a chain of mall arcades marketed at adults and inspired by the history of the Chuck E. Cheese brand, with locations featuring classic arcade games, retro-themed merchandise and statues of the animatronic characters on display. A location in Kansas City, Missouri, branded as Chuck's Arcade and Pizzeria, features original artwork used in Chuck E. Cheese stores and a full food menu. All Fun Spot Arcade locations were converted to the Chuck's Arcade name, citing a lack of profitability from the Fun Spot Arcade name. As of July 2025, ten Chuck's Arcade locations were opened in malls across the United States.

In August 2025, the company announced that they plan to open an active play center called "Chuck E. Cheese Adventure World", featuring larger versions of the Adventure Zones seen in standard Chuck E. Cheese locations. The first Adventure World location would open in November 2025 in Arlington, Texas.

== Entertainment ==
=== Films and series ===
In 1983, Pizza Time Theatre created a Christmas TV special, titled The Christmas That Almost Wasn't, produced by animation company Kadabrascope, a Pizza Time Theatre subsidiary. The special centers around Chuck E. Cheese and Jasper T. Jowls as they travel to the North Pole to save Christmas.

In 1999, Chuck E. Cheese released a direct-to-video film, titled Chuck E. Cheese in the Galaxy 5000, produced by FUNimation Entertainment. The movie follows Chuck E. Cheese and his friends as they travel to a distant planet to win money to fix Charlie Rockit's aunt and uncle's tractor engine.

In September 2020, CEO David McKillips said that the company had recently launched an entertainment division, the goal being to produce movies and TV shows featuring the CEC cast of characters.

In January 2024, CEC Entertainment announced a game show being developed by Magical Elves. The series would feature adults competing with larger versions of Chuck E. Cheese arcade games such as pinball, air hockey, and Skee-Ball. As of June 2025, no more details have been announced.

In June 2025, CEC Entertainment announced an animated Christmas film called A Chuck E. Cheese Christmas, produced by HappyNest Entertainment. The film was released on both Amazon Prime Video, and the Chuck E. Cheese YouTube channel on November 27, 2025. The special features Nathan Kress as the voice of Chuck E. Cheese.

=== Video arcade ===
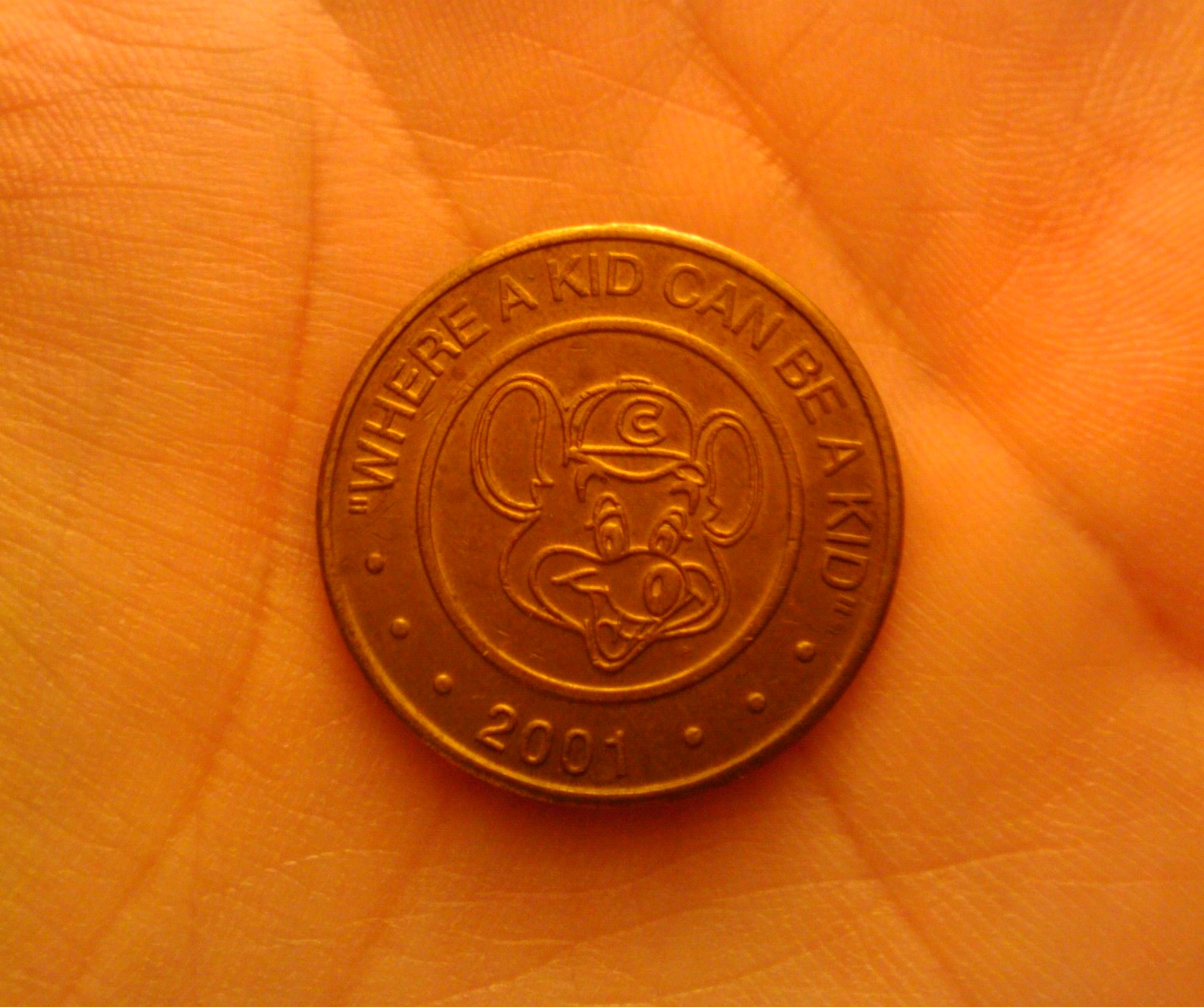
A 2001 Chuck E. Cheese's token

Since the company's inception, one of the primary draws for the business has been its video arcade offering inside restaurants. Within the arcade, customers can play card-operated video games or redemption games, the latter of which involves games of skill that reward players in the form of tickets based on score. Tickets can be redeemed later for merchandise, such as candy and toys. In late 2020, paper tickets were retired and replaced with electronic tickets, which are stored on the Play Pass cards.

The coin-op games originally accepted brass tokens issued by the company, stamped with various logos and branding that evolved over time. The company experimented with a card access method as a replacement for tokens in the late 2000s, which allowed customers to load credits onto a card that could then be swiped for access at arcade games and refilled later. It was tested under different names, including "Chuck E.'s Super Discount Card" and "Chuck E. Token Card". In late 2016, a new card system known as "Chuck E.'s Play Pass" was introduced to replace tokens throughout the chain, utilizing a similar method of gameplay as the Token Card.

=== Animatronics ===
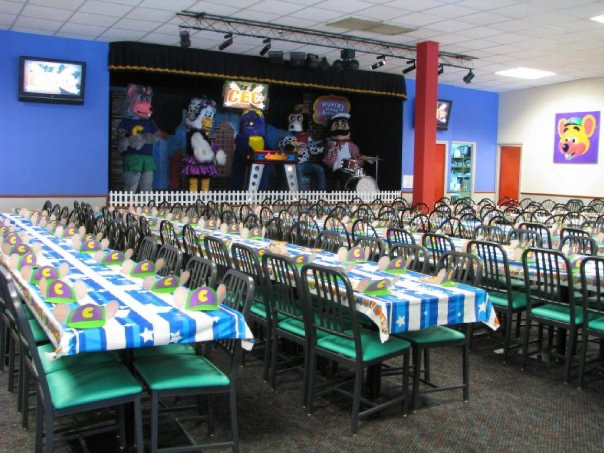
A Cyberamics Munch's Make Believe Band "1-Stage" in Lo Barnechea, Chile, 2012

Another primary draw for the chain from its beginnings until the mid-2010s has been their animatronic shows. There have historically been several different styles of animatronic shows in use within the company, details of which would vary depending on when the location opened, whether it was renovated, available room for animatronic stages, and other factors. Over the years, these animatronics have often been supplemented by (and in recent years completely replaced by) costumed characters.

When the first location opened in 1977, the animatronic characters were featured as busts in framed portraits hanging on the walls of the main dining area. The original show featured Crusty the Cat (the first character to face retirement, as he was soon replaced with Mr. Munch in 1978), Pasqually the Singing Chef, Jasper T. Jowls, the Warblettes, and the main focus of the show, Chuck E. Cheese. By 1979, many restaurants had also added "cabaret" shows in separate rooms of each restaurant. One of the early Cabaret characters was Dolli Dimples, a hippopotamus who played the piano and sang in the blues/jazz style of performer Pearl Bailey. The in-house control system, which consisted of a 6502-based controller in a card cage with various driver boards, was called "Cyberamics".

While Fechter separately produced the Rock-afire Explosion animatronics for ShowBiz Pizza through the early 1980s, Bushnell and Pizza Time Theatre continued work on characters for their portrait format and newer Balcony Stage shows under the umbrella of the Pizza Time Players. Development on Cabaret concepts slowed greatly after Pizza Time Theatre Inc.'s bankruptcy in 1984 and its purchase by ShowBiz a year later. From 1985 to 1990, the merged company kept their brands (and their respective animatronic shows) mostly separate. After Fechter refused to sign over the rights to the Rock-afire Explosion to Showbiz Pizza Time, Inc., "Concept Unification" was undertaken beginning in 1990 and continuing through 1993 to eliminate Fechter's characters from ShowBiz locations and replace them with that of the Chuck E. Cheese's. The animatronics built by Creative Engineering for their Rock-afire Explosion band were retrofitted as "Chuck E. Cheese & Munch's Make Believe Band", with new costumes and cosmetics. The exact year of when Concept Unification started is debated by fans. At first, the existing Pizza Time Theatre Cyberamics did not coincide with the character update, but were later reconfigured and costumed to reflect the updated Munch's Make Believe Band character designs.

In November 1990, ShowBiz Pizza Time debuted a new stage show for future CEC locations called the "Road Stage". It was the first Cyberamic stage to use the Munch's Make Believe Band format to coincide with Concept Unification. The Road Stage featured a full-bodied Chuck E. Cheese Cyberamic standing on a platform, while the rest of the half-bodied band characters were set on buildings. The first location to install this stage opened in Jonesboro, Georgia in November 1990, and the last Road Stage location opened in June 1992 in Sun Valley, California. In February 1992, the Cyberamic 2-Stage debuted at the location in White Settlement, Texas, featuring Chuck E. and the band on two separate stages. The last location to install a 2-Stage was in Florence, Kentucky between 2002 and 2003. In March 1992, the 1-Stage debuted at the Waldorf, Maryland location, featuring all characters together on one stage. The last location to install a 1-Stage was in Citrus Heights, California, between 2014 and 2015.

In August 1996, a test stage at the Valley View Mall/Montfort Drive location in Dallas, Texas, was created—the first attempt at a single-character animatronic stage, The Awesome Adventure Machine. This animatronic show consisted of neon flashy lights and items around the show. This stage took over what is commonly referred to as a "3-Stage" (an animatronic show converted from a former Rock-afire Explosion show from ShowBiz Pizza Place). This animatronic show was never installed in any other location and was removed by late 1997 or early 1998 and replaced by Studio C.

A "Studio 'C' 2000" in Laguna Hills, California, 2017

Beginning in December 1997 with the location in Brookfield, Wisconsin, a new animatronic show began being installed in new stores, referred to as "Studio C". It consisted of a single 32-movement Chuck E. Cheese animatronic character created by Garner Holt alongside large television monitors, lighting effects, and interactive elements. Studio C eventually served as the replacement for Munch's Make Believe Band stages, with the last MMBB location opening in Mentor, Ohio in July 1998. Following the discontinuation of MMBB shows, the Studio C series of stages continued to evolve, starting with the Small-Town Studio C 2000 in early 2000, the "Studio C 2000" in late 2000, and the Small-Town Studio C 2003 in July 2003. The last new Chuck E. Cheese's location to receive a new Studio C 2000 stage opened in Concepción, Chile in August 2012, and the last existing Chuck E. Cheese's location to receive a Studio C 2000 was in Cincinnati, Ohio around 2014.

In late 2009, a new single-character stage was conceptualized by Westerville, Ohio-based brand agency Chute Gerdeman for Chuck E. Cheese's, and this idea became the "Star Stage". The Star Stage debuted in April 2010 as a test stage at the new Valley View Mall/Montfort Drive location in Dallas, Texas, replacing their Studio C 2000 stage. The Montfort Drive location's Star Stage reused the 32-movement Chuck E. Cheese animatronic, and the scenery included two side vertical video walls, curtains for the main stage, a cutout background, and two lowering recording studio and sports stadium backdrops. Chuck E.'s stage and the "APPLAUSE" and "ON THE AIR" signs were recycled from Montfort Drive's Studio C 2000 stage. The stage curtains would be removed by late April 2010 and side video walls would be replaced with flatscreen TVs in early 2012. Former CEC entertainment director Jeremy Blaido ordered for the show be removed in 2012 due to internal controversy with new entertainment director Robert Gotcher at the time, leading to Gotcher being fired that year. The Star Stage at the Chuck E. Cheese's location in Dallas ended up being removed in August 2012 after over 2 years in operation.

In September 2010, a new stage titled the "Chuck E.'s Make Believe Band" stage (also known as Concept Unification 1-Stage by fans) was tested at the location in Whitehall, Pennsylvania. It reused the Concept Unification animatronics from the 3-Stage and put them on a single stage with new backdrops. On this show, Munch's Make Believe Band would be renamed to Chuck E.'s Make Believe Band. Two more CU 1-Stage shows would be installed at the locations in Springfield, Illinois and Columbus, Georgia in 2011 before it was retired. The Chuck E.'s Make Believe Band stage is Chuck E. Cheese's latest stage featuring the full band to date.

On April 26, 2011, a new test stage titled the "Galaxy Stage" debuted at the new Chuck E. Cheese's location in West Melbourne, Florida. The Galaxy Stage was themed around a futuristic city, and was the first Studio C stage not to use the Studio C name. It did not expand beyond its test location, and was removed in April 2023 during the West Melbourne location's 2.0 remodel renovations.

Following the removal of the Dallas (Montfort Drive) location's Star Stage in August 2012, a new stage premiered at the same location, referred to as "Circles of Light", utilizing the animatronic Chuck E. Cheese produced by Garner Holt for the previous Studio C series of stages. The stages were manufactured by Corman & Associates, and the control system for the new stage type was produced by Weigl Controls, developing a custom version of their ProCommander series of controllers for CEC.

In July 2020, the location in Darien, Illinois replaced their 3-Stage animatronics and props with the Studio C 2000 backdrops and 16-movement animatronic from the location in Joliet, Illinois, which had been remodeled in early 2020. Another installation of this unique stage would be installed in November 2020 at the location on Kedzie Avenue in Chicago, Illinois. The Darien location would remove their stage during their remodel in June 2023, and the Chicago (Kedzie) location would remodel and remove their stage in August 2024.

For stores still featuring animatronics, updated programs for Munch's Make Believe Band stages were generally distributed on DVD between 2007 and 2022. Studio 'C' stores ran off of three DVDs and a floppy disk from 1999 to 2022, previously having used LaserDisc. Weigl (Circles of Light stages and Dance Floors) stores use a USB and a MicroSD card.

In mid-2022, a new system for running the animatronic shows (3-Stage, Cyberamics, and all Studio 'C' and Weigl shows) was introduced that, instead of using physical media such as DVDs, would function using the store's Wi-Fi connection. The implementation of said device caused a problem for the Studio C shows, as their previous show system(s) had special file formats for programming signals; therefore the switch to the new system would cause no animatronic movements to happen, except for a "Random Movements" program. The Munch's Make Believe Band stages (CEI and Cyberamics shows) were not affected by this change of systems, although programming of new songs would cease in 2023 due to budget cuts.

==== Elimination of animatronics ====
In 2002, Chuck E. Cheese's opened three locations, two in Waco and Lake Jackson, Texas, and one in Dover, Delaware, experimenting with a new type of format featuring a smaller layout, a buffet, no play structures, no animatronic stage (albeit featuring a "blue screen" from the Studio 'C' stages), and a constant presence of the Chuck E. Cheese costumed character. All three "Chuck E. Cheese's Buffet" locations would remodel to standard Chuck E. Cheese's and receive "Small-Town Studio 'C'" stages with an animatronic between 2003 and 2006.

In September 2012, The "Circles of Light" stage at the Montfort Drive location in Dallas, Texas removed their animatronic, initially using the stage platform for costumed character performances. Beginning in early 2013, Circles of Light stages began being installed in newly opened stores without an animatronic, although a few Circles of Light stores would open with an animatronic from 2012 to 2018. In 2014, the Montfort Drive location would test a prototype of the "Chuck E. Live Stage" in their gameroom.

In August 2013, the newly opened location in Montgomery, Alabama was the first Chuck E. Cheese's in 11 years to open without any animatronics, as it opened with a Circles of Light stage with no Chuck E. animatronic. Circles of Light would also replace 4 older animatronic stages in CEC locations between March 2014 and September 2017. The first being a 3-Stage in San Antonio, Texas in March 2014, a 1-Stage in Rohnert Park, California between late 2014 and early 2015, another 3-Stage in Matteson, Illinois in February 2015, and another 3-Stage in Wilmington, Delaware in September 2017. The last existing Chuck E. Cheese's location to receive a COL stage was in San Jose, California in December 2018, while the last new location to receive a COL stage was in Port of Spain, Trinidad & Tobago in February 2023.

By May 2015, the "Chuck E. Live Stage", also known as "Stage V2" or commonly referred to as the "Dance Floor", which featured no animatronics at all, a modernized dance floor, and performances only with costumed characters, had been created. In 2017, the chain announced that animatronic shows would be removed entirely in favor of this design in seven pilot locations. After the pilot locations showed promise, retirement of animatronics at Chuck E. Cheese locations accelerated and continued through 2019, by which time 80 of its stores were expected to be retrofitted to the new design.

In November 2023, the company announced one location in Northridge, California as the first "legacy and new" store location that would keep their animatronic stage, which is a 2-Stage Cyberamics show. The grand reopening for this store after the remodel was held on November 10, 2023, with Nolan Bushnell attending. They would go back on this stance in May 2024 with a New York Times article announcing a location in Nanuet, New York as the second "legacy and new" store. Nanuet has a Studio 'C' 2000, 16M stage. The grand reopening was held on July 18.

In May 2024, the animatronic shows were reported to have been set to be phased out by the end of 2024, with all but two venues discontinuing their performances, the locations in Northridge, California and Nanuet, New York. The decision aligned with Chuck E. Cheese's strategic transformation towards modernization since 2020, including the introduction of digital entertainment features such as screens, digital dance floors, and trampoline gym areas. After a negative response from the public, the company subsequently announced on May 24 that three additional locations would be keeping their animatronic stages: Charlotte, North Carolina, which has a 3-Stage; Hicksville, New York, which has a Cyberamics 1-Stage; and Springfield, Illinois, which has a CU 1-Stage. Hicksville held their grand reopening on July 19, Springfield held their grand reopening on July 25, and Charlotte held their grand reopening on July 26.

In May 2025, the company stated they would be keeping the animatronic stage at its branch on Sheppard Avenue in the Willowdale neighborhood of Toronto, which has a 2-Stage. The grand reopening was held on July 24, 2025.

In July 2025, Chilean news site EnerGeek reported that the Chuck E. Cheese franchise in Chile would be moving the 1-Stage animatronic stage show from the Lo Barnechea (Cantagallo) location, which was announced to be closing in August, to a different location in the country, making it the seventh "Legacy Location", following the model of the Legacy Locations in the United States and Canada. Reasons to create this model locally were to honor the history of the Cantagallo location, which was the first Chuck E. Cheese in the country of Chile, along with the animatronic show being restored to working order in 2025, utilizing parts from another location in the country that had relocated in 2024.

=== Music ===
Another primary focus of entertainment for Chuck E. Cheese is the music performed by the main cast of characters and occasional side characters, which play in the restaurants and are additionally posted to the company's social media channels and music streaming accounts. The main cast of characters perform in a band known as "Munch's Make Believe Band", formed in 1990 due to the "Concept Unification" initiative undertaken by ShowBiz Pizza Time to replace the Rock-Afire Explosion. Originally, licensed cover songs were used, alongside parodies of licensed songs, and occasional original music, but original music became the only material used beginning in 2014 to save money from music licensing fees, except for occasional public domain songs such as "Bingo" and "Deck the Halls". In 2019, the company began releasing the band's music on Spotify and Apple Music.

=== Characters ===
- Chuck E. Cheese (voiced by Jaret Reddick) is the titular mascot, a mouse who is the lead singer and guitarist of the band. He is outgoing, friendly, and likes singing and entertaining families.
- Helen Henny (voiced by Caroline Taylor) is the other lead singer and guitarist, a gaming female chicken. She is sometimes shown to have a crush on Chuck E.
- Mr. Munch (voiced by Chris Hill) is the keyboardist, a purple monster-alien who has a habit of eating anything, including pizza. He is also the band's namesake and DJ.
- Jasper T. Jowls (voiced by Jeremy Blaido) is the bassist, a bloodhound dog from Tennessee.
- Pasqually P. Pieplate (voiced by Earl Fisher), the drummer and the only main human character, a chef who hails from southern Italy and likes telling jokes.
- Bella Bunny, the band's tambourine player and a Hispanic rabbit who has her own garden.

== Food ==
While pizza is the main menu item at Chuck E. Cheese, the menu includes various other items such as cold-cut sandwiches, chicken wings, salad bars, and desserts. In addition, some Chuck E. Cheese locations offer alcoholic beverages.

In March 2020, during the COVID-19 pandemic, the restaurant began selling pizza, wings, desserts and more through food delivery services under the ghost kitchen Pasqually's Pizza & Wings. The Pasqually name comes from Pasqually P. Pieplate, a member of Munch's Make Believe Band, the Chuck E Cheese animatronic band. While food sold under this brand comes from the same brick-and-mortar kitchens as Chuck E. Cheese, the company claims to use different ingredients and recipes that cater to a more mature audience. Practically all of the Chuck E. Cheese stores in the United States were selling and delivering food under this virtual brand. Pasqually's also served as an opportunity for the company to experiment with new flavors and dishes, and a CEC spokesperson noted some items might be added to the Chuck E. Cheese menu in the future. According to Mashed, Pasqually's Pizza & Wings shut down in March 2025.

In October 2024, the company announced a partnership with Thrifty Ice Cream for a birthday cake ice cream flavor inspired by Chuck E. Cheese, to be sold at 34 Chuck E. Cheese fun centers and 350 Rite Aid locations in Southern California.

In May 2025, the company announced an exclusive flavor of Dippin' Dots ice cream called "Chuck E.'s Cookie Crunch", only available at Chuck E. Cheese locations.

== Legacy ==
The restaurant concept inspired the horror video game series Five Nights at Freddy's, in which the player controls a pizza restaurant security guard monitoring rogue animatronic characters. In October 2023, Chuck E. Cheese held a promotional event titled "Five Nights of Fun", parodying the game's 2023 film adaptation. On the promotion, Chuck E. Cheese CEO David McKillips remarked, "Imitation is the sincerest form of flattery."

The chain has also been referenced in films such as Willy's Wonderland (2021), a horror comedy that has been described as taking place in a "Chuck E. Cheese-esque" family entertainment center.

It inspired the depiction of "Polly's Pizzeria" in the 2025 Netflix animated film In Your Dreams.
