= Chuck E. Cheese (character) =

Restaurant chain mascot

Charles Entertainment Cheese
- Chuck E. Cheese character
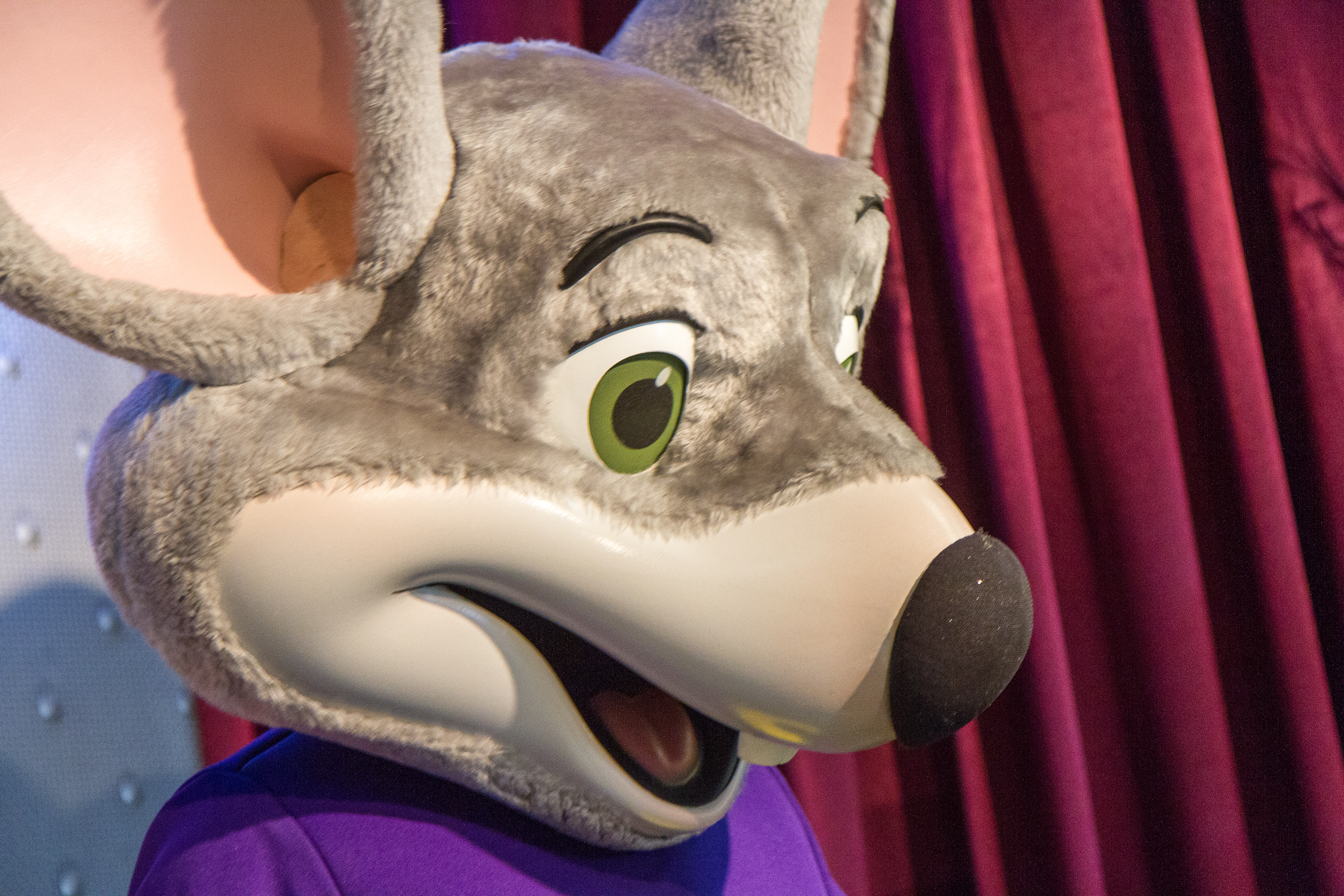
- First appearance: May 17, 1977
- Created by: Nolan Bushnell; Robert Allan Black
- Voiced by: John Widelock (1977–1984); Scott Wilson (1984–1993); Lonny Wilder (April 1986); Duncan Brannan (1994–2012); Jeff Cosco (1995–1996; singing voice); Jeremy Blaido (1997–1998); Jaret Reddick (2012–present); Nathan Kress (2025-present, Chuck E and Friends only)

In-universe information
- Full name: Charles Entertainment Cheese
- Nicknames: Chuck E.; The Big C
- Species: Rat (1977–1993); Mouse (1993–present)
- Gender: Male
- Occupation: Restaurateur; Guitarist; Vocalist
- Origin: New Jersey, United States
- Nationality: American

Charles Entertainment "Chuck E." Cheese is the mascot of CEC Entertainment Concepts L.P.'s Chuck E. Cheese chain of family entertainment centers (FECs) From 1977 to 1993, he was an anthropomorphic rat, becoming an anthropomorphic mouse in 1993. In 2012, he was rebranded into a slimmer, rockstar-themed version as a response to a decrease in sales during 2011.

== History ==
The 2004 incarnation of Chuck E.

The character was originally created as the mascot for a restaurant proposed by Nolan Bushnell (founder of Atari) in 1977. Bushnell attended the International Association of Amusement Parks and Attractions (IAAPA) conference in Orlando and saw walk-around character costumes for sale. Among them, Bushnell spotted a costume that appeared to be a coyote, so he bought it for his planned Coyote Pizza restaurant. When the costume arrived at Atari, it was discovered that the costume was actually a rat with a long pink tail; this costume was also much larger and furrier than the final product seen in all of the original locations. Bushnell decided to change the restaurant's name to Rick Rat's Pizza. However, Bushnell's group of planners believed that a rat for the name of a restaurant would not be appropriate. Bushnell's group of planners finally decided on the name Chuck E. Cheese for the mascot and changed the restaurant's name to Chuck E. Cheese's Pizza Time Theatre. The first Chuck E. Cheese's Pizza Time Theatre opened in San Jose, California on 370 South Winchester Boulevard, in the same year Chuck E. Cheese was proposed – 1977.

== Design and characterization ==
The rat mascot was originally given a New Jersey accent and would tell jokes – occasionally holding a cigar, although it was retired during the Great American Smokeout in 1980. The character's voice was delivered by John F. Widelock for the first seven years of its existence, and afterward by Scott Wilson. In an April 1986 show tape (The History of Rock & Roll), Chuck E. Cheese was voiced by Lonny Wilder due to PTT's merger with ShowBiz Pizza Place into ShowBiz Pizza Time. Wilson returned with the next released show.

In 1993, Duncan Brannan was hired as the new voice of the mascot, with the task of transforming him from a rat to a mouse. By 1995, the character was given a "child-friendly" redesign, with a wider cheek structure, a less pointy and shorter snout, longer eyes, smaller ears, and a slimmer physique, with Jeff Cosco (vocalist of the band Cheater) providing the character's singing voice in two shows in 1995 and 1996. The character began being characterized as a skateboarder in commercials starting in 1997, with this version of him beginning to appear in locations by 2004.

In July 2012, the company's mascot was again redesigned, this time incorporating a rockstar-influenced incarnation of the character that played a guitar. Jaret Reddick (vocalist and guitarist of Bowling for Soup) replaced Brannan as the voice of Chuck E. Cheese.

== Arrest of performer ==
On July 23, 2025, a man employed as a Chuck E. Cheese walkaround performer, named Jermell Jones, was arrested in full costume for credit card theft at a Chuck E. Cheese in Tallahassee, Florida, confusing and upsetting children and adults who were unaware of the portrayer's criminal activities.
