= Cat Thomas =

American voice actress (born 1997)

- Born: Catherine Marie Thomas; January 10, 1997 (age 29); Texarkana, Texas, U.S.
- Other name: Cate Smyth
- Education: University of Houston
- Occupations: Voice actress, stage actress
- Years active: 2018–present

Catherine Marie Thomas (born January 10, 1997) is an American voice and stage actress. Her roles are Yui Yuigahama in My Teen Romantic Comedy SNAFU, Karin Istel in Love Flops, Marie in Girls und Panzer and other multiple roles.

== Biography ==
Thomas was born on January 10, 1997 in Texarkana, Texas. During her fourth grade in her native Texarkana, she participated in a stage play of Romeo and Juliet. Thomas had completed her Teaching Artist training with the Young Audiences of Houston Arts Learning Lab and graduated from University of Houston. She made her voice acting debut for Sentai Studios in 2018 and is one of the founders of a local production company, Says Who? Productions.

== Filmography ==
=== Anime television series ===
Year	Title	Role	Notes	Source
2018	Girls' Last Tour	Chito	Debut role	
2018	Revue Starlight	Kiriko Masai		
2019	Manaria Friends	Anne		
2019	My Teen Romantic Comedy SNAFU	Yui Yuigahama	First season	
2019	My Teen Romantic Comedy SNAFU Too!	Yui Yuigahama		
2020	7 Seeds	Hibari Niigusa		
2020	BanG Dream! 2	Moca Aoba		
2020	My Teen Romantic Comedy SNAFU Climax	Yui Yuigahama		
2021	Kakegurui	Itsuki Sumeragi	Sentai Studios dub	
2022	Made in Abyss: The Golden City of the Scorching Sun	Faputa		
2022	Shenmue: The Animation	Nozomi Harasaki		
2022	The Eminence in Shadow	Nu		
2023	Akiba Maid War	Yumechi		
2023	Love Flops	Karin Istel	Credited as "Cate Smyth"	
2024	Helck	Sharuami Rafaed		
2024	Oshi no Ko Season 2	Koyuki Yoshidomi		
2024	Jellyfish Can't Swim in the Night	Emi		
2025	From Bureaucrat to Villainess: Dad's Been Reincarnated!	Anna Doll		
2025	Rock Is a Lady's Modesty	Natsuki		

=== Anime films ===
Year	Title	Role	Notes	Source
2021	Princess Principal: Crown Handler	Mary		
2022	Revue Starlight the Movie	Kiriko Masai		
