= Chitose Karasuma =

Chitose Karasuma may refer to:

- Chitose Karasuma, a character in the media franchise Galaxy Angel
- Chitose Karasuma, a character in the media franchise Girlish Number
