= Anime-Gatari =

Japanese short animation

- Key visual

アニメガタリ
- Genre: Comedy
- Original video animation
- Directed by: Kenshirō Morii
- Studio: W-Toon Studio
- Released: April 17, 2015 – 2016
- Anime television series

Anime-Gataris
- Directed by: Kenshirō Morii
- Produced by: Utsumi Hiroshi; Kenji Ebato; Yáo Xīn; Hiroaki Takeuchi
- Written by: Mitsutaka Hirota
- Music by: Keigo Hoashi; Kuniyuki Takahashi
- Studio: Wao World
- Licensed by: Crunchyroll
- Original network: Tokyo MX, BS Fuji, AT-X
- Original run: October 8, 2017 – December 24, 2017
- Episodes: 12
- icon

Anime-Gatari (アニメガタリ; lit. Anime-chat) is a Japanese short animation that served as intermission for Toho Cinemas' animated films at Shinjuku, Tokyo from 2015 to 2016. The anime follows the rapid-fire chit-chat of "charming characters" in an anime club at the Tokyo University. An anime television series based on the short and titled Anime-Gataris (アニメガタリズ) aired from October 8 to December 24, 2017.

== Characters ==
=== Animegataris ===
Minoa Asagaya (阿佐ヶ谷 未乃愛, Asagaya Minoa)
Voiced by: Kaede Hondo (Japanese); Dawn M. Bennett (English)
A girl who just recently began watching anime. She wants to reopen the inactive anime club, even though she is still unfamiliar with anime. She is Maya's younger sister.
Arisu Kamiigusa (上井草 有栖, Kamiigusa Arisu)
Voiced by: Sayaka Senbongi (Japanese); Alison Viktorin (English)
A girl with an ojou-sama manner but she is actually an otaku who likes moe characters.
Miko Kōenji (高円寺 美子, Kōenji Miko)
Voiced by: Hisako Tōjō (Japanese); Elizabeth Maxwell (English)
Minoa's friend who likes to read light novels before watching their anime adaptations. She often clashes with Arisu on differences of opinion.
Kai Musashisakai (武蔵境塊)
Voiced by: Setsuo Itō (Japanese); Alejandro Saab (English)
A member of the anime club and an eccentric. His particular interest is in media typically associated with chuunibyou, and is a chuuni himself. He generally looks nerdy, but when he takes his glasses off he is considered as a handsome and charming young man. He is the one having a crush on Miko.
Nakano Mitsuteru (中野光輝, Mitsuteru Nakano)
Voiced by: Junta Terashima (Japanese); Jordan Dash Cruz (English)
A member of the anime club and an upperclassman. He, like Neko-sensei, actually came from the Anime World, and his real name is pronounced Aurora; he came to the real world to acquire the power to change it into his preferred pronunciation.
Yui Obata (小幡 唯, Obata Yui)
Voiced by: Rie Takahashi (Japanese); Kristen McGuire (English)
Neko-Senpai (ネコ先輩, Neko Senpai)
Voiced by: Hironori Kondou (Japanese); Brad Smeaton (English)
A talking cat from the secret room in the anime club.

=== Animegatari ===
Maya Asagaya (阿佐ヶ谷 マヤ, Asagaya Maya)
Voiced by: Inori Minase (Japanese); Katelyn Barr (English)
A new member who is not familiar with anime. In Animegataris, Maya is a third year high student and Minoa's older sister.
Erika Aoyama (青山 絵里香, Aoyama Erika)
Voiced by: Anju Inami (Japanese); Felecia Angelle (English)
A girl who seems to be a normie outside, but is actually an otaku. In Animegataris, Erika is a third year student at Sakaneko High School and the president of anime research club.

=== Other ===
Tsubaki Akabane (赤羽椿, Akabane Tsubaki)
Voiced by: Asuka Nishi (Japanese); Jamie Marchi (English)
Tsubaki is the Student Council President at Sakaneko High School and used to be Erika's childhood friend. Now that Tsubaki considers Erika to be a nuisance, she is determined to have the anime club shut down at any cost.
Ayame Osaki (大崎菖蒲, Osaki Ayame)
Voiced by: Natsumi Takamori (Japanese); Jeannie Tirado (English)
Student Council Vice-President.
Matsuri Toda (戸田茉莉, Toda Matsuri)
Voiced by: Miyu Takagi (Japanese); Megan Shipman (English)
Sakeneko High School student council Treasurer.
Masato Gomon (五門真人, Gomon Masato)
Voiced by: Makoto Furukawa (Japanese); Cris George (English)
The anime club's advisor.
Toru Roppongi (六本木透, Roppongi Toru)
Voiced by: Naomi Maruyama (Japanese); J. Michael Tatum (English)
Yui's homeroom teacher and supervisor of the sports club.
Principal
Voiced by: Ryūsei Nakao (Japanese); Ian Sinclair (English)
The principal of Sakaneko High School. He is a former member of the anime club and creator of the anime "Eternal Symphony" that Minoa loves so much. However it was cancelled after the first episode due to the fans' critiques, hence why he wants to shut down the current anime club.
Beibei Yang (楊貝貝, Yang Beibei)
Voiced by: Kana Hanazawa (Japanese); Trina Nishimura (English)
An otaku girl and exchange student from Beijing, China. She met Minoa during the Otacon and also goes to the same school as her sister.
Shugo Asagaya (阿佐ヶ谷修吾, Asagaya Shugo)
Voiced by: Kenta Zaima (Japanese); Kyle Phillips (English)
Minoa and Maya's Father. He is an otaku but hides it to keep his perfect father image to his daughters (which he fails).
Ai Asagaya (阿佐ヶ谷愛, Asagaya Ai)
Voiced by: Ai Kakuma (Japanese); Natalie Hoover (English)
Minoa and Maya's Mother. She has no problem revealing her husband is an otaku.

== Anime ==
The short animation served as an intermission for Toho Cinemas animated films at Shinjuku from 2015 to 2016. The anime follows the rapid-fire chit-chat of "charming characters" in an anime club at the Tokyo University.

An anime television series partially served as the prequel aired from October 8 to December 24, 2017. The opening theme is "Aikotoba" (アイコトバ, Password) by Garnidelia, and the ending theme is "Good Luck Lilac" by GATALIS, a unit form consisting of Kaede Hondo, Sayaka Senbongi, and Hisako Tōjō. Crunchyroll streamed the series while Funimation streamed a simuldub.

No.	Title	Original release date
1	"Minoa, Anime Rookie!"; Transliteration: "Minoa, Anime Rūkī!" (Japanese: ミノア、アニメルーキー！)	October 8, 2017
Minoa finds out Arisu is an otaku and decides to help reopen the inactive anime club. She later finds a mysterious room in the clubroom where she finds a beret and a strange cat.
2	"Anime-Gataris, Assemble!"; Transliteration: "Tsudoe, Anime-Gataris" (Japanese: ツドエ、アニメガタリズ)	October 15, 2017
Minoa and Arisu starts recruiting students for the anime club.
3	"Erika, Cosplayer x Cosplayer"; Transliteration: "Erika, reiyā × reiyā" (Japanese: エリカ、レイヤー×レイヤー)	October 22, 2017
Erika takes Minoa and the others to Akihabara to expose Minoa to more anime-related stuff while figuring out how to keep the anime research club from being abolished by the student council.
4	"Club Room Go Boom!"; Transliteration: "Bushitsu, daibakuhatsu!" (Japanese: ブシツ、ダイバクハツ!)	October 29, 2017
Arisu explains to Minoa about anime production and business. In order to prove their club is productive, the club is asked by the Drama Club to help with the costumes for their play. However Erika hits a roadblock when designing the costumes.
5	"Beibei, Don't Go"; Transliteration: "Beibē, ikenai susumenai" (Japanese: ベイベー、イケナイススメナイ)	November 5, 2017
Summer has arrived and the anime club head to Comiket, while there they meet Yang Beibei, a Chinese girl studying Japanese who tells them that anime is popular in China as well.
6	"Kaikai Love Climax"; Transliteration: "Kaikai, rabu kuraimakkusu" (Japanese: カイカイ、ラブクライマックス)	November 12, 2017
The anime club is traveling to certain places in Japan that anime used for their stage (currently going to Oorai). Meanwhile, Kai is suffering from love-struck from Miko and Minoa is trying to find her goal in the club while getting into a string of bad luck situations.
7	"Miko Quits Writing"; Transliteration: "Miko, danpitsusengen" (Japanese: ミコ、ダンピツセンゲン)	November 19, 2017
With the culture festival coming up, the anime club decide to participate to show their progress. However when the student council rejected the anime screening, they decided to do anime shorts which actually is harder than it looks.
8	"Arisu Can't Make Enough Money"; Transliteration: "Arisu, okanegatarimasenwa" (Japanese: アリス、オカネガタリマセンワ)	November 26, 2017
Tsubaki proposes the anime club fill the auditorium or the club will be shut down. The anime club must complete their presentation and get a full house in 2 days. Minoa and Maya finds out their dad's secret (even though it's not a big deal).
9	"The Anime Club: Forever Snobs"; Transliteration: "Aniken, zuttotengu" (Japanese: アニケン、ズットテング)	December 3, 2017
With the success at the festival, the other clubs come to the anime club for advice which later gets out of hand.
10	"Anime Club Finally Falls"; Transliteration: "Aniken, yattohaibu" (Japanese: アニケン、ヤットハイブ)	December 10, 2017
Betrayed by one of their own, the anime club is disband. In order to find out the reason, Minoa and Neko-Senpai confronts the Principal and finds out his secret.
11	"Our Friend Kouki's Second Betrayal"; Transliteration: "Kyō ni go rishi kōki (mei yū) no uragi ri" (Japanese: 共ニ語リシ光輝（めいゆう）ノ裏切リ ミノア、カタルシス)	December 17, 2017
Minoa starts noticing anime things are happening in real life. The secret room in the anime club is revealed.
12	"Minoa, Katharsis"; Transliteration: "minoa, katarushisu" (Japanese: ミノア、カタルシス)	December 24, 2017
In order to save the two worlds from merging into one, Minoa and Neko-Senpai have to convince Nakeno to change his mind.
