= Kaede Hondo =

Japanese voice actress

- 本渡 楓
- Born: March 6, 1996 (age 30); Nagoya, Aichi Prefecture, Japan
- Occupation: Voice actress
- Years active: 2015–present
- Agent: I'm Enterprise

Kaede Hondo (本渡 楓, Hondo Kaede; born March 6, 1996) is a Japanese voice actress affiliated with I'm Enterprise. She has had leading roles in several series, including Kamisama Minarai: Himitsu no Cocotama as Kokoro Yotsuba, Interviews with Monster Girls as Hikari Takanashi, Girlish Number as Yae Kugayama, Anime-Gatari as Minoa Asagaya, Katana Maidens ~ Toji No Miko as Kanami Eto, Comic Girls as Koyume Koizuka, Hinamatsuri as Hitomi Mishima, Magical Sempai as Sempai, Zombie Land Saga as Sakura Minamoto, Bofuri as Maple/Kaede Honjō, Wandering Witch: The Journey of Elaina as Elaina, and Star Detective Precure! as Mikuru Kobayashi/Cure Mystique. She won the Best New Actress Award at the 13th Seiyu Awards.

== Biography ==
Born in Aichi Prefecture, She became interested in anime while watching Naruto. Hondo became interested in acting and modelling, after an incident during her fifth year of elementary, and when a woman came near and saying she has "a face that goes well with makeup". She had some research on her own job, and came to believe she was told she has a face suitable for an actress or a model. She would start auditioning for various acting and modelling jobs, but she did not initially consider voice acting as an option. As she had a desire to perform in front of people, she joined the theatre club. Hondo acted in school plays and also participated in activities, such as swimming, basketball, soft tennis, and softball. While in her third year of school, one of her instructors was a radio personality, and her experiences with them and the club influenced her to become a voice actress. In pursuit of this career, she enrolled at the Japan Narration Actor Institute. After completing her training, she became affiliated with the voice acting agency I'm Enterprise. She made her voice acting debut in 2015, playing minor roles in series such as Aoharu × Machinegun. She had a leading role for the anime series Kamisama Minarai: Himitsu no Cocotama.

Hondo played the roles for Keijo and Girlish Number. She and the other main cast members of Girlish Number also performed the series' opening theme "Bloom" and ending theme "Ima wa Mijikashi Yumemiyo Otome" (今は短し夢見よ乙女). She voiced Hikari Takanashi in Interviews with Monster Girls, Kon Tatsumi in Urara Meirocho, Minoa Asagaya in Anime-Gataris, Kanami Etō in Katana Maidens ~ Toji No Miko, Koyume Koizuka in Comic Girls, Hitomi Mishima in Hinamatsuri, Kohaku Tsukishiro in Iroduku: The World in Colors, and Sakura Minamoto in Zombie Land Saga.

Hondo won the Best New Actress Award at the 13th Seiyu Awards. Other notable roles including Magical Sempai, Val × Love, Bofuri, Wandering Witch: The Journey of Elaina, I've Been Killing Slimes for 300 Years and Maxed Out My Level, Seirei Gensouki: Spirit Chronicles, Mieruko-chan, Takt Op. Destiny, and Deep Insanity: The Lost Child.

== Filmography ==
=== Anime ===
Year	Title	Role
2015	Aoharu x Machinegun	Yūka
2015	Diabolik Lovers More, Blood	Melissa
2015	Lance N' Masques	Student
2015	Kamisama Minarai: Himitsu no Cocotama	Kokoro Yotsuba, Nicolie
2015	Noragami Aragoto	Tomoko
2015	Magical Somera-chan	Kukuru Nonomoto
2016	Dagashi Kashi	Girl
2016	Active Raid	Girl
2016	Please Tell Me! Galko-chan	Yabana
2016	BBK/BRNK	Laetitia Nilgiri Swanson
2016	Undefeated Bahamut Chronicle	School Girl
2016	The Asterisk War 2nd Season	Maria
2016	Shōnen Maid	Hiroshi Takei, Antaro, Kuromame
2016	Momokuri	School Girl
2016	Handa-kun	Miyoko Kinjo
2016	Regalia: The Three Sacred Stars	Yuinshiel Asteria
2016	91 Days	Luce Lagusa
2016	Danganronpa 3: The End of Hope's Peak High School	Aiko Umezawa
2016	Magical Girl Raising Project	Sumire
2016	BBK/BRNK 2: The Gentle Giants of the Galaxy	Laetitia Nilgiri Swanson
2016	Monster Hunter Stories: Ride On	Hanako
2016	Girlish Number	Yae Kugayama
2016	Keijo	Kazane Aoba
2016	Poco's Udon World	Nozomi Tanaka
2017	Urara Meirocho	Kon Tatsumi
2017	Fuuka	Chitose Haruna
2017	Interviews with Monster Girls	Hikari Takanashi
2017	Kirakira Pretty Cure a la Mode	Miku Kenjo
2017	Battle Girl High School	Kanon Kōgami
2017	Love and Lies	Kizuna Nejima
2017	Anime-Gataris	Minoa Asagaya
2018	Katana Maidens ~ Toji No Miko	Kanami Etō
2018	School Babysitters	Midori Sawatari, Yuki Ushimaru
2018	Märchen Mädchen	Ariko Kasumi
2018	Comic Girls	Koyume Koizuka
2018	Hinamatsuri	Hitomi Mishima
2018	Magical Girl Site	Mikari Izumigamine
2018	Chio's School Road	Yuki Hosokawa
2018	RErideD: Derrida, who leaps through time	Mayuka
2018	Zombie Land Saga	Sakura Minamoto
2018	Boarding School Juliet	Nia Pomera
2018	Iroduku: The World in Colors	Kohaku Tsukishiro
2019	Mini Toji	Kanami Etō
2019	That Time I Got Reincarnated as a Slime	Tear
2019	Demon Slayer: Kimetsu no Yaiba	Shigeru Kamado
2019	Magical Sempai	Sempai
2019	Hensuki: Are You Willing to Fall in Love with a Pervert, as Long as She's a Cutie?	Mizuha Kiryū
2019	Welcome to Demon School! Iruma-kun	Iks Elisabetta
2019	Val × Love	Natsuki Saotome
2020	Bofuri	Maple/Kaede Honjō
2020	If My Favorite Pop Idol Made It to the Budokan, I Would Die	Reo Igarashi
2020	Love Live! Nijigasaki High School Idol Club	Haruka Konoe
2020	Shadowverse	Mimori Amamiya
2020	Wandering Witch: The Journey of Elaina	Elaina
2021	Zombie Land Saga Revenge	Sakura Minamoto
2021	I've Been Killing Slimes for 300 Years and Maxed Out My Level	Laika
2021	Osamake	Shion Ōragi
2021	Seirei Gensouki: Spirit Chronicles	Flora Beltrum
2021	Mieruko-chan	Hana Yurikawa
2021	Takt Op. Destiny	Anna Schneider
2021	Deep Insanity: The Lost Child	Sumire Motiki
2022	Akebi's Sailor Uniform	Yasuko Nawashiro
2022	Kotaro Lives Alone	Hiromi, Kakeru
2022	I'm Quitting Heroing	Echidna
2022	Love Live! Nijigasaki High School Idol Club 2nd Season	Haruka Konoe
2022	Ya Boy Kongming!	Eiko Tsukimi
2022	Dance Dance Danseur	Miyako Godai
2022	Parallel World Pharmacy	Charlotte "Lotte" Soller
2022	Lucifer and the Biscuit Hammer	Yuuhi Amamiya (young)
2023	Bofuri 2nd Season	Maple/Kaede Honjō
2023	The Iceblade Sorcerer Shall Rule the World	Clarisse Cleveland
2023	The Reincarnation of the Strongest Exorcist in Another World	Fiona Urd Alegreif
2023	Dr. Stone: New World	Kirisame
2023	Reborn as a Vending Machine, I Now Wander the Dungeon	Lammis
2023	Sweet Reincarnation	Licorice Mill Fubaareku
2023	Pokémon Horizons: The Series	Nanjamo/Iono
2023	Rail Romanesque 2	Umi
2023	The 100 Girlfriends Who Really, Really, Really, Really, Really Love You	Hakari Hanazono
2023	Protocol: Rain	Seshiru Satō
2024	A Sign of Affection	Rin Fujishiro
2024	The Strongest Tank's Labyrinth Raids	Nin
2024	Rising Impact	Yumiko Koizumi
2024	Mission: Yozakura Family	Mutsumi Yozakura
2024	One Piece	Vegapunk Atlas
2024	Shinkalion: Change the World	Mai Oume
2024	The New Gate	Tiera Lucent
2024	Tying the Knot with an Amagami Sister	Yuna Amagami
2024	Tadaima, Okaeri	Michiru Mochizuki
2024	Blue Archive the Animation	Hifumi Ajitani
2024	The Most Notorious "Talker" Runs the World's Greatest Clan	Tanya Clark
2025	The Daily Life of a Middle-Aged Online Shopper in Another World	Primura
2025	Welcome to Japan, Ms. Elf!	Marie
2025	The 100 Girlfriends Who Really, Really, Really, Really, Really Love You 2nd Season	Hakari Hanazono
2025	The Too-Perfect Saint	Mia Adenauer
2025	The Water Magician	Sera
2025	Our Last Crusade or the Rise of a New World	Mizerhyby Hydra Nebulis IX
2025	Toilet-Bound Hanako-kun	Hiromi, Female student
2025	I Saved Myself with a Potion!: Life in Another World	Kaede
2026	Star Detective Precure!	Mikuru Kobayashi/Kumi Hanasaki/Cure Mystique
2026	The Classroom of a Black Cat and a Witch	Spica Virgo
2026	I Want to End This Love Game	Natsuki Moegi
2026	Daemons of the Shadow Realm	Yuru (young)
2026	The World's Strongest Rearguard	Misaki
2026	The Forsaken Saintess and Her Foodie Roadtrip in Another World	Gomamiso
2026	The Insipid Prince's Furtive Grab for the Throne	Lynfia
2026	BanG Dream! Yume∞Mita	Viola
2026	Vertex Force	Haruka Todo
2027	Arcanadea	Lumitea

=== Films ===
Year	Title	Role
2016	Pop in Q	Daren
2017	Kamisama Minarai: Himitsu no Cocotama Movie – Kiseki wo Okose♪	Kokoro Yotsuba
2018	Mirai	Mirai Ota (Baby)
2020	Date A Live Fragment: Date A Bullet	Hibiki Higoromo
2022	Sword Art Online Progressive: Scherzo of Deep Night	Liten
2023	Gekijōban Collar × Malice Deep Cover	Ichika Hoshino
2025	Zombie Land Saga: Yumeginga Paradise	Sakura Minamoto

=== Video games ===
Year	Title	Role
2015	Battle Girl High School	Kanon Kōgami
2016	Kantai Collection	Oyashio
2016	Idol Connect Asterisk Live	Chino Haneda
2016	Atelier Firis: The Alchemist and the Mysterious Journey	Firis Mistlud
2017	Song of Memories	Kanon Hiiragi
2017	SINoALICE	Princess Ibara
2017	Project Tokyo Dolls	Sakura
2017	Yashiro ni Ho e to	Hachiman Hakodate
2017	Atelier Lydie & Suelle: The Alchemists and the Mysterious Paintings	Firis Mistlud
2017	Yuki Yuna Is a Hero: Hanayui no Kirameki	Tamako Doi
2018	Grand Chase: Dimensional Chaser	Cindy
2018	Memories Off -Innocent Fille-	Kotori Miki
2018	Onsen Musume: Yunohana Collection	Uika Atami
2018	Dead or Alive Xtreme Venus Vacation	Fiona
2018	Schoolgirl Strikers	Koharu Minato
2018	Judgment	Tsukino Saotome
2019	Nelke & the Legendary Alchemists: Ateliers of the New World	Firis Mistlud
2019	Granblue Fantasy	Tabina
2020	Love Live! School Idol Festival All Stars	Haruka Konoe
2020	Arknights	Suzuran
2020	Dragalia Lost	Pinon
2021	Re:Zero − Starting Life in Another World: The Prophecy of the Throne	Pooka
2021	A Certain Magical Index: Imaginary Fest	Salome
2021	Tsukihime -A piece of blue glass moon-	Ciel
2021	Alchemy Stars	Tiny One & Robyn
2021	Melty Blood: Type Lumina	Ciel
2021	Gran Saga	Iris & Arche
2021	Blue Archive	Hifumi Ajitani
2022	Azur Lane	SN Kronshtadt, RN Torricelli
2022	Digimon Survive	Aoi Shibuya
2022	Magia Record	Mikoto Sena
2022	Goddess of Victory: Nikke	Novel
2023	404 Game Re:set	Fighting Vipers
2023	RED: Pride of Eden	Marluh
2023	Pokémon Masters EX	Shou/Akari
2024	Persona 5: The Phantom X	Closer
2025	Wuthering Waves	Phoebe
2025	Venus Vacation Prism: Dead or Alive Xtreme	Fiona
2025	D.C. Re:tune	Nemu Asakura
2027	Romancing SaGa 3: Destinies United	Sarah Carson

=== Dubbing ===
- Freakier Friday (Harper Coleman (Julia Butters))
