= Wataru Watari =

Japanese light novelist

Wataru Watari 渡 航
- Born: January 24, 1987 (age 39); Chiba, Japan
- Education: Meiji University
- Occupation: Novelist
- Writing career
- Period: 2009–present
- Genre: Light novel
- Notable work: My Youth Romantic Comedy Is Wrong, as I Expected
- Notable awards: 3rd Shogakukan Gagaga Bunko Light Novel Award

Wataru Watari (渡航, Watari Wataru; born 24 January 1987) is a Japanese light novel author and screenwriter. His most notable series is My Youth Romantic Comedy Is Wrong, as I Expected. He is often referred to as Watarin (わたりん) by his fan base.

== Overview ==
Watari was born on 24 January 1987 in Chiba, Chiba Prefecture. He graduated from high school in March 2005 before attending and graduating from the Information and Communication Faculty of Meiji University in March 2009.

He debuted with his novel Ayakashigatari (あやかしがたり) in May of the same year, which won the 3rd Shogakukan Gagaga Bunko Light Novel Award.

In March 2011, the first volume of his most known work, My Youth Romantic Comedy Is Wrong, as I Expected, was published by Gagaga Bunko. This series received its first anime adaptation in April 2013, followed by a continuation in April 2015 before concluding with a final season in 2020.

His next work, Kuzu to Kinka no Qualidea (クズと金貨のクオリディア) was published in January 2015. This novel alongside its sequels written by Kōshi Tachibana and Sō Sagara were adapted into an anime in July 2016. Dōdemo Ii Sekai Nante: Qualidea Code, a further novel written by Watari, was released during the airing of the anime.

Watari's next major project, Girlish Number, started as a serial novel in March 2016 and ended in July 2017. He also wrote the manga and the anime adaptation in 2016.

== Personal life ==
He currently lives in his hometown of Chiba. During high school, Watari joined a volleyball club but after witnessing the social hierarchy found in many clubs, he quit and from that point on decided to forgo high school clubs and instead work part-time in local family restaurants and Convenience stores. Due to this, he made little friends and lived a modest high school life.

When his debut work Ayakashigatari won the 3rd Shogakukan Gagaga Bunko Light Novel Award in 2009, a judge for the award, Romeo Tanaka, described Watari's style as "well-structured, well-thought-out, well-written, and sharp-witted," and the work itself as "masterful writing and highly polished."

Watari states that the reason for becoming a light novelist was fueled by difficulties in finding a job at the time; when he heard of the Shogkaukan Light Novel Awards, he felt like he could do it and that he was interested in the publishing world. Currently, he works as an office worker during the day and writes during the night, and has no plans in becoming a full-time writer.

He is close friends with fellow light novelists Sō Sagara and Kōshi Tachibana; together, they formed the writing group Speakeasy. Watari and Sagara co-authored the light novel Kazu to Kinka no Qualidea; the main heroine, Yuu Chigusa, is modeled after Watari. Watari is also close friends with voice actors Takuya Eguchi and Chado Horii, and has participated in their event Eguwatachado and DVD.

== Works ==
=== Novels ===
==== Ayakashigatari series ====
No.	Title	Release date	ISBN
1	Ayakashigatari (あやかしがたり)	20 May 2009	9784094511338
2	Ayakashigatari Ni (あやかしがたり2)	18 November 2009	9784094511697
3	Ayakashigatari San (あやかしがたり3)	20 April 2010	9784094511987
4	Ayakashigatari Yon (あやかしがたり4)	18 November 2010	9784094512380

==== Standalone novels ====
- Get Up! Get Live!, (February 2020) (Published by Bungeishunjū, illustrated by Yura, ISBN 9784163911687)

=== Short story anthologies ===
- Haganai Universe (Bocchi wa Henkakyū ga Nagerarenai) (November 2011) (Published by MFBunko J, original story by Yomi Hirasaka, illustrated by Ponkan8, ISBN 9784040664682)
- My Youth Romantic Comedy Is Wrong, As I Expected: Anthology 1, Yukino Side (Kakushite, Kare no Mae ni Aratana Teki wa Arawareru) (March 2020) (Published by Gagaga Bunko, ISBN 9784094518351)
- My Youth Romantic Comedy Is Wrong, As I Expected: Anthology 2, On Parade (Yahari Imōto Saerebaii) (March 2020) (Published by Gagaga Bunko, ISBN 9784094518368)

=== Anime ===
- My Teen Romantic Comedy SNAFU (2013) – Original work, screenwriter (OVA)
- My Teen Romantic Comedy SNAFU Too! (2015) – Original work, screenwriter (OVA)
- Qualidea Code (2016) – Original work, screenwriter (Episodes 3, 8, 9, 11)
- Girlish Number (2016) – Original draft, series composition, screenwriter (Episodes 1, 2, 3, 6, 7, 11, 12)
- Domestic Girlfriend (2019) – Screenwriter (Episodes 5, 7, 9)
- Get Up! Get Live! (2020) – Story
- My Teen Romantic Comedy SNAFU Climax (2020) – Original work, screenwriter (OVA)
- The Saint's Magic Power Is Omnipotent (2021) – Series composition, screenwriter (Episodes 2, 7)
- Parallel World Pharmacy (2022) – Series composition
- The Magical Revolution of the Reincarnated Princess and the Genius Young Lady (2023) – Series composition
- Ron Kamonohashi's Forbidden Deductions (2023) – Series composition
- The Saint's Magic Power Is Omnipotent 2nd Season (2023) – Series composition
- Ron Kamonohashi's Forbidden Deductions 2nd Season (2024) – Series composition
- Young Ladies Don't Play Fighting Games (2026) – Series composition
- Hello, I am a Witch, and My Crush Wants Me to Make a Love Potion! (2026) – Series composition
