= Maria Naganawa =

Japanese voice actress

- 長縄 まりあ
- Born: Aichi Prefecture, Japan
- Occupation: Voice actress
- Years active: 2008–present
- Agent: I'm Enterprise
- Musical career
- Label: Lantis
- Website: lantis.jp/special/maria_naganawa/

Maria Naganawa (長縄 まりあ, Naganawa Maria) is a Japanese voice actress from Aichi Prefecture, Japan. She is affiliated with I'm Enterprise, and her notable animation roles include Laffey in Azur Lane, Kanna Kamui in Miss Kobayashi's Dragon Maid, Nazuna Hiwatashi in BNA: Brand New Animal, Komekko in KonoSuba, Platelet in Cells at Work!, Junna Tokura in HUGtto! Precure, Blanche de Médicis in Parallel World Pharmacy, Shizuka Yoshimoto in The 100 Girlfriends Who Really, Really, Really, Really, Really Love You, and Komugi Inukai/Cure Wonderful in Wonderful Precure!.

== Biography ==
On November 1, 2025, Maria Naganawa announced the release of her first big-label mini-album, Microcosmos, signed under Lantis, which would be released on December 24, 2025.

== Filmography ==
=== Anime series ===
| Year | Title | Role | Notes | Source |
|---|---|---|---|---|
| 2008 | Chibi Miku-San!:The Animation | Akita Neru | | |
| 2010 | Mayoi Neko Overrun! | Fumino Serizawa (Child) | | |
| 2014 | Invaders of the Rokujyōma!? | Theiamillis "Theia" Gre Fortorthe | | |
| 2015 | Ani Tore! EX | Shion Tachibana | | |
| 2015 | Komori-san Can't Decline | Masako Negishi | | |
| 2015 | Magical Somera-chan | Ai Matsushima | | |
| 2016 | Ani Tore!! XX | Shion Tachibana | | |
| 2016 | Divine Gate | Ruri | | |
| 2016 | Kiitarō Shōnen no Yōkai Enikki | Yuki Musume | | |
| 2016 | Magic of Stella | Tamaki Honda | | |
| 2016 | Occultic;Nine | Chizu Kawabata | | |
| 2016 | Pandora in the Crimson Shell: Ghost Urn | Amy Gilliam | | |
| 2016 | Undefeated Bahamut Chronicle | La Krusche | | |
| 2017 | Miss Kobayashi's Dragon Maid | Kanna Kamui | | |
| 2017 | KonoSuba 2 | Komekko | | |
| 2017 | Two Car | Tsugami Nakajima | | |
| 2018 | Slow Start | Kamuri Sengoku | | |
| 2018 | Cells at Work! | Platelet | | |
| 2018 | Sword Gai: The Animation | Rie Matoba | | |
| 2019 | Wasteful Days of High School Girls | Saku "Loli" Momoi | | |
| 2019 | Azur Lane | Laffey | | |
| 2019 | Z/X Code reunion | Matoi Shinonome | | |
| 2020 | BNA: Brand New Animal | Nazuna Hiwatashi | | |
| 2020 | Magatsu Wahrheit -Zuerst- | Ilma | | |
| 2021 | Back Arrow | Sam | | |
| 2021 | Yatogame-chan Kansatsu Nikki 3 Satsume | Serura Dobe | | |
| 2021 | Azur Lane: Slow Ahead! | USS Laffey | | |
| 2021 | The Detective Is Already Dead | Alicia | | |
| 2021 | Miss Kobayashi's Dragon Maid S | Kanna Kamui | | |
| 2022 | Estab Life: Great Escape | Maruteese | | |
| 2022 | In the Heart of Kunoichi Tsubaki | Kibushi | | |
| 2022 | Don't Hurt Me, My Healer! | Celia | | |
| 2022 | Parallel World Pharmacy | Blanche de Médicis | | |
| 2023 | A Galaxy Next Door | Fumio Kuga | | |
| 2023 | KonoSuba: An Explosion on This Wonderful World! | Komekko | | |
| 2023 | World Dai Star | Yae Niizuma | | |
| 2023 | The 100 Girlfriends Who Really, Really, Really, Really, Really Love You | Shizuka Yoshimoto | | |
| 2023 | The Rising of the Shield Hero Season 3 | S'yne Lokk | | |
| 2024 | Wonderful PreCure! | Komugi Inukai/Cure Wonderful | | |
| 2024 | Failure Frame: I Became the Strongest and Annihilated Everything with Low-Level Spells | Kobato Kashima | | |
| 2025 | Sorairo Utility | Hina Yoarashi | | |
| 2025 | Gachiakuta | Guita | | |
| 2026 | A Misanthrope Teaches a Class for Demi-Humans | Sui Usami | | |
| 2026 | Medalist 2nd Season | Roba Manaka | | |
| 2026 | Young Ladies Don't Play Fighting Games | Arisa Fujimiya | | |
| 2026 | The World's Strongest Witch | Ruru Ru Rie | | |
| 2026 | Super Psychic Policeman Chojo | Robo-kun | | |
| 2026 | Magical Girl Raising Project: Restart | Cherna Mouse | | |

=== Anime film ===
- Colorful Ninja Iromaki (2016), Midorimaki
- Laidbackers (2019), Ran (Valvaran)
- KonoSuba: God's Blessing on this Wonderful World! Legend of Crimson (2019), Komekko
- High School Fleet: The Movie (2020), Shia "Nomu" Nomura
- Miss Kobayashi's Dragon Maid: A Lonely Dragon Wants to Be Loved (2025), Kanna

=== Web anime ===
- Monster Strike (2017), Daikokuten (Femele)

=== Video games ===
- Tokyo 7th Sisters (2014), Saeki Hina
- Kaden Shōjo (2015), Ramu, Neiro
- Chrome Magna (2015), Miyuki
- Alternative Girls (2017), Miyuki Usui
- Grand Chase Dimensional Chaser (2017), Scarde Vi Serdin
- Lydie & Soeur no Atelier: Fushigi na Kaiga no Renkinjutsushi (2017), Lydie Marlen
- Azur Lane (2017), Laffey
- Yuki Yuna is a Hero: A Sparkling Flower, Mito Fujimori
- Magia Record (2018), Mito Aino
- Onsen Musume: Yunohana Collection (2018), Koyuki Ginzan
- Master of Eternity (2018) as April
- O.N.G.E.K.I (2018), Arisu Suzushima
- VALKYRIE CONNECT (2019), Kindred Spirit Camilly
- Sdorica -Mirage- (2019), Misa
- Browndust (2019) as Anastasia
- Dragalia Lost (2019), Lathna
- Gunvolt Chronicles: Luminous Avenger iX (2019), Maria
- The King of Fighters All Star (2019), Pretty Chang
- Mahjong Soul (2019), Yuzu
- Punishing: Gray Raven (2019), Pulao
- Arknights (2020) as Weedy
- Girls' Frontline (2021) Sig MCX and Savage 99
- Dead or Alive Xtreme Venus Vacation (2021), Koharu
- Blue Archive (2021), Natsu Yutori
- Girl Cafe Gun (2021), Aniya Jung
- Granblue Fantasy (2021), Wamdus
- Alchemy Stars (2022), Amy, Raphaela, Kanna Kamui
- Fate/Grand Order (2022), Mary Anning
- The Legend of Heroes: Trails Through Daybreak II (2022), Mare
- Goddess of Victory: Nikke (2023), Biscuit
- Honkai: Star Rail (2023), Huohuo
- Azur Lane (2023), USS Laffey (DD-724)
- Pokémon Masters EX (2024), Poppy
- Dragon Nest (2025), Artar (female)
- Duet Night Abyss (2025), Fina
- StarSavior (2025), Omega Control
- BraveSword X BlazeSoul (2026), Imitation=Satania
- Neverness to Everness (2026), Lacrimosa
- Stella Sora (2026), Firefly
- Nekopara: Sekai Connect (2026), Carambola

=== Dubbing ===
==== Live-action ====
- My Spy, Sophie
- No Way Up, Rosa

==== Animation ====
- The Loud House, Lola Loud and Lily Loud
- Miraculous: Tales of Ladybug & Cat Noir, Tikki
