= My Teen Romantic Comedy SNAFU Climax =

- Season 3
- Cover of the first Blu-ray volume released by Marvelous! in Japan on September 25, 2020, featuring Yukino Yukinoshita
- No. of episodes: 12

Release
- Original network: TBS
- Original release: July 9 – September 24, 2020

Season chronology
- ← Previous; OreGairu Too!

My Teen Romantic Comedy SNAFU Climax (Japanese: やはり俺の青春ラブコメはまちがっている。完, Hepburn: Yahari Ore no Seishun Rabukome wa Machigatteiru Kan) is a 2020 comedy, slice of life Japanese anime series based on Wataru Watari's light novel series My Youth Romantic Comedy Is Wrong, as I Expected. It is the third and final season of the series, which began airing in 2013 with a second season in 2015. After realizing the perceived superficiality of their club and relationships, Hachiman Hikigaya, Yukino Yukinoshita, and Yui Yuigahama confront their genuine thoughts and feelings about their situation - and each other - while organizing a variety of social events as they finish their second year at Soubu High School.

The season is produced by animation studio Feel and directed by Kei Oikawa, with series composition by Keiichirō Ōchi (replacing Shōtarō Suga who died in 2015), character designs by Yuichi Tanaka, music by Monaca, and sound direction by Satoshi Motoyama. The season was originally going to premiere on April 9, 2020, on TBS, with later airings on MBS, CBC, and BS-TBS, and streaming on Amazon Prime Video, before being delayed to July 2020 due to the COVID-19 pandemic. The anime's production used a "trial and error" process that accounts for the safety of the production staff. The third season aired from July 9 to September 24, 2020. Sentai Filmworks has licensed the season globally excluding Asia. In Southeast Asia, the season is licensed by Medialink and released on streaming service iQIYI. The season ran for 12 episodes.

The season uses six pieces of theme music: one opening theme, three ending themes, and two insert songs. The main opening theme is "Megumi no ame" (芽ぐみの雨, Sprout rain) by Nagi Yanagi. The main ending theme is "Diamond no jundo" (ダイヤモンドの純度, Diamond clarity) by Yukino Yukinoshita (Saori Hayami) and Yui Yuigahama (Nao Tōyama). Two additional variations of this ending theme is used: Diamond no jundo -Ballade Arrange-Yui Solo Ver. (ダイヤモンドの純度 ~Yui Ballade~) by Yuigahama (Tōyama) as the ending theme of the fourth episode and Diamond no jundo -Ballade Arrange-Yukino Solo Ver. (ダイヤモンドの純度 ~Yukino Ballade~) by Yukinoshita (Hayami) as the ending theme of the eleventh episode. As in Season 2, "Bitter Bitter Sweet" is used as the insert song for the first episode and also performed by Yukinoshita (Hayami) and Yuigahama (Tōyama). "Yukitoki" (ユキトキ) by Yanagi is used again as the insert song for the final credits of the twelfth episode.

== Episodes ==
Story	Episode	Title (Note: All English titles are taken from Sentai Filmworks.)	Directed by	Written by	Original release date	Ref.
27	1	"In Due Time, the Seasons Change and the Snow Melts."; Transliteration: "Yagate, Kisetsu wa Utsuroi, Yuki wa Toke Yuku." (Japanese: やがて、季節は移ろい、雪は解けゆく。)	Kei Oikawa	Keiichirō Ōchi	July 9, 2020	
At the end of their visit to Kasai Rinkai Park, Hachiman ponders how he, Yukino, and Yui will find a genuine solution to the challenges they face with their relationship. After buying them drinks and chatting about Yui's cookies, Hachiman prompts Yukino to tell him and Yui her request. Yukino explains she plans to strike her own path in life instead of following in the footsteps of her parents and sister. She requests Hachiman and Yui support her in her endeavors to become a more capable, independent person. To this end, Yukino resolves to move out of her apartment and back to her family home and smooth things over with her family. After Hachiman and Yui accept her request, they travel to Yukino's apartment where they are greeted by Yukino's older sister Haruno, who is intoxicated. Flashing forward to the next day, Hachiman checks in on his younger sister Komachi, who prepares for the interview-based second stage of her entrance exam for Hachiman's high school. He agrees to meet her at the Marinpia shopping centre after her exam; while waiting for her, he runs into his classmate Saki Kawasaki and her younger sister Keika. Hachiman and Saki discuss her younger brother's entrance exams and their experiences with younger siblings before an elated Komachi joins them. After Saki and Keika leave, Hachiman and Komachi go on a shopping trip before returning home. Komachi insists on organizing the house and doing chores to make up for her inability to do so while she was studying for her exams. Afterwards, she gives her older brother a heartfelt thanks for his support of her, which brings rare tears to Hachiman's eyes.
28	2	"That Key Was Never Handled Until Today."; Transliteration: "Kyō made, Sono Kagi ni wa Ichi Domo Fureta Koto ga nai." (Japanese: 今日まで、その鍵には一度も触れたことがない。)	Shōhei Yamanaka	Keiichirō Ōchi	July 16, 2020	
At her apartment, Yukino notifies her sister Haruno she decided to move back to her family. Haruno acknowledges Yukino has finally grown up and even says she will herself have a talk with their mother about Yukino. She tells Yukino to pack up, Yui offers her help and accepts Haruno's offer to stay overnight. Haruno and Hachiman leave. On the street, they have a conversation, where Haruno asks Hachiman to take care of Yukino and underlines the difference between herself and Hachiman in which she does not want to always be Yukino's older sister. The next day, Hayama speaks to Hachiman and makes it clear Haruno has told him about yesterday's events. He also sees Yukino has changed. After class, during the club's meeting, Isshiki comes to the club's room and offers to organize a prom party for the next year's graduation. Yukino accepts Isshiki's proposal, stressing the fact she made this decision personally, and not as the president of the club. That evening, Yui comes to her room and recalls a certain event from yesterday's time spent with Yukino - left alone in Yukino's room, Yui notices a photo of Yukino and Hachiman made during their visit of Destiny Land hidden among plush toys in Yukino's bed. In her inner monologue, Yui acknowledges she had known for a long time how Yukino feels towards Hachiman and acknowledges her own feelings towards him but admits her inability to influence anything.
29	3	"Iroha Isshiki is the Strongest Junior, as Expected."; Transliteration: "Yahari, Isshiki Iroha wa Saikyō no Kōhai de aru." (Japanese: やはり、一色いろはは最強の後輩である。)	Ryutarō Suzuki	Keiichirō Ōchi	July 23, 2020	
Hachiman's sister Komachi gets emotional after being accepted in high school. Later, he talks to Iroha, and helps with the promotional photoshoot and video for the graduation prom she planned with Yukino.
30	4	"By Chance, Yui Yuigahama Thinks of the Future."; Transliteration: "Futo, Yuigahama Yui wa Mirai ni Omoi o Haseru." (Japanese: ふと、由比ヶ浜結衣は未来に思いを馳せる。)	Shota Imai	Keiichirō Ōchi	July 30, 2020	
The promotional video for the Prom proves popular, and after the meeting Yui helps Hachiman buy a gift for his sister. Later on Yukino's mother announces there are people opposing the Prom. Yukino once again wants to take care of the situation by herself, but later news makes Hachiman get involved and Yui has to be honest with herself.
31	5	"Shizuka Hiratsuka Deeply Longs for the Days Past."; Transliteration: "Shimijimi to, Hiratsuka Shizuka wa Itsuka no Mukashi o Natsukashimu." (Japanese: しみじみと、平塚静はいつかの昔を懐かしむ。)	Shuntarō Tozawa	Keiichirō Ōchi	August 6, 2020	
Hachiman's teacher, Shizuka Hiratsuka, warns him the school's administration is slyly trying to cancel the Prom. On his way to see Yukino, Hachiman is intercepted by Iroha. Later, he confronts Yukino about getting involved with the Prom, even though she still refuses to rely on him in order to become more independent.
32	6	"Once again, Hachiman Hikigaya Makes a Speech."; Transliteration: "Aratamete, Hikigaya Hachiman Yahata wa Katarikakeru." (Japanese: あらためて、比企谷八幡はかたりかける。)	Shota Imai	Keiichirō Ōchi	August 13, 2020	
Iroha is upset Hachiman's challenge to Yukino complicated the plans for the Prom. She tells him her reasons why she wants the Prom to happen so badly. That night, he talks about graduations' events with his sister Komachi. The next day, he tells Yui of his plan and recruits some manpower. While looking for information about Proms with Hachiman, Yui thinks about how things will change and her dreams end.
33	7	"Until the End, Yui Yuigahama Will Continue Watching Over Them."; Transliteration: "Saigo made, Yuigahama Yui wa Mimamoritsuzukeru." (Japanese: 最後まで、由比ヶ浜結衣は見守り続ける。)	Shōhei Yamanaka	Keiichirō Ōchi	August 20, 2020	
Yoshiteru recruits Hatano and Sagami from the gaming club to help Hachiman get Yukino's Prom accepted, with a proposal which will make hers look really good by comparison. To increase their plan's credibility, Yui and Hachiman meet with Orimoto and Tamanawa, from Kahin Sogo High School, and the boys have a rap-battle. After settling on a project name and working on a website, Hachiman has a friendly conversation with Yukino outside. Yui tells Yukino she is helping Hachiman.
34	8	"Wishing That, At the Very Least I Don't Make Any More Mistakes."; Transliteration: "Semete, mō Machigaetakunai to Negai Nagara." (Japanese: せめて、もうまちがえたくないと願いながら。)	Ryutarō Suzuki	Keiichirō Ōchi	August 27, 2020	
Hayato Hayama tells Hachiman he cannot support his dummy Prom plan. The website for the fake Prom plan goes online. Teacher Shizuka and Hachiman meet with an unlikely ally who figured out his dummy plan. Yui is bothered by Haruno saying earlier Hachiman, Yukino, and Yui are co-dependent. Hachiman goes to see Yukino when the fate of the Prom is settled, and she makes a surprising request. Later, she meets with Yui who is finally honest with herself about her feelings.
35	9	"A Whiff of that Fragrance Will Always Bring Memories of that Season."; Transliteration: "Kitto, Sono Kaori o Kagu Tabi ni, Omoidasu Kisetsu ga aru." (Japanese: きっと、その香りをかぐたびに、思い出す季節がある。)	Taisuke Tsukuda	Keiichirō Ōchi	September 3, 2020	
With the Prom Graduation Party to take place, Hachiman makes good on his promise to Yukino. He will grant Yui whatever wish within his abilities. She has many but she also wants to grant him a wish. At school Yukino mentions the Prom requires a lot of logistics, but refuses Hachiman's offer to help. The following Saturday, Yui invites Hachiman to bake sweets for his little sister, Komachi. Later on the graduation ceremony is very emotional to the president of the student council, Meguri.
36	10	"Gallantly, Shizuka Hiratsuka Moves Forward."; Transliteration: "Sassō to, Hiratsuka Shizuka wa Mae o Aruku." (Japanese: 颯爽と、平塚静は前を歩く。)	Tatsuya Sasaki	Keiichirō Ōchi	September 10, 2020	
The night of the Graduation Prom, Hachiman acknowledges he decides to help when he is needed. That evening, Yui asks him for a dance. Afterwards the Prom-team gather in the Student Council's room and are visited by Yukino's mother and Haruno. When the others leave, Yui, Yukino, and Hachiman share a heartfelt conversation, and he meets with Haruno, giving him much food for thought. His teacher, Shizuka Hiratsuka, offers to drive Hachiman home due the late hour, and they end up talking at a baseball batting range.
37	11	"Only a Heated Touch Truly Conveys the Sentiment."; Transliteration: "Omoi wa, Fureta Netsu Dakega Tashikani Tsutaeteiru." (Japanese: 想いは、触れた熱だけが確かに伝えている。)	Ryutarō Suzuki	Keiichirō Ōchi	September 17, 2020	
Shizuka tells Hachiman feelings cannot be expressed with only one word, like 'codependence'. He decides his relationship with the girls is a sham, due their lack of honest communication. After school he has a talk with Yui about the Service Club's end, and also wanting to continue to associate with Yukino, making Yui heartbroken. Iroha confronts the gaming-club about a Prom not involving the Students Council, while Hachiman -who is behind it- meets with Yukino, her mother and sister. Afterwards, Hachiman and Yukino have a long conversation on a bridge, trying to convey their feelings in spite of their poor communication and social skills.
38	12	"My Teen Romantic Comedy is Wrong, As I Expected."; Transliteration: "Yahari Ore no Seishun Rabukome wa Machigatteiru." (Japanese: やはり俺の青春ラブコメはまちがっている。)	Tatsuya Sasaki	Keiichirō Ōchi	September 24, 2020	
Hachiman and Yukino meet to plan a joint prom with other schools, but are short on time, manpower, and budget. They visit a potential location for the Prom, and he misunderstands her comment when they see a wedding. The next day, more people than expected show up to help out, and later the boys take a break relaxing at a sauna. While they prepare the ballroom, Komachi shows up and Iroha gives romantic advice to Yui. After the event, Hachiman and Yukino wrap things up and she leaves him speechless with a confession. While dealing with the aftermath of the joint-prom, Komachi and Iroha come by to resuscitate the 'Service Club', and Yui has a request.

== Home media ==
Marvelous! released the season in Japan on six Blu-ray and DVD volumes between September 25, 2020, and March 26, 2021. Limited Edition Blu-ray volumes included bonus light novels of the series.

Marvelous! (Region 2 - Japan)
Vol.	Episodes	Blu-ray / DVD artwork	Notable bonus material	Release date	Ref.
1	1, 2	Yukino Yukinoshita	Light Novel / Drama CD / Original Soundtrack	September 25, 2020	
2	3, 4	Yui Yuigahama	Light Novel / Drama CD / Original Soundtrack	October 28, 2020	
3	5, 6	Iroha Isshiki	Light Novel / Drama CD / Original Soundtrack	November 27, 2020	
4	7, 8	Saika Totsuka	Light Novel / Drama CD / Original Soundtrack	January 15, 2021	
5	9, 10	Shizuka Hiratsuka	Light Novel / Drama CD / Original Soundtrack	March 8, 2021	
6	11, 12	Yukino Yukinoshita, Yui Yuigahama, Iroha Isshiki, Saika Totsuka, Shizuka Hiratsuka, Hachiman Hikigaya	Light Novel / Drama CD / Original Soundtrack	March 26, 2021	
