= Young Ladies Don't Play Fighting Games =

Japanese manga series and its adaptations

- First tankōbon volume cover, featuring Mio Yorue

対ありでした。 ～お嬢さまは格闘ゲームなんてしない～ (Tai Ari Deshita: Ojō-sama wa Kakutō Gēmu Nante Shinai)
- Genre: Comedy drama; Yuri
- Manga
- Written by: Eri Ejima
- Published by: Media Factory
- English publisher: NA: Seven Seas Entertainment
- Magazine: Monthly Comic Flapper
- Original run: January 4, 2020 – present
- Volumes: 11
- Television drama
- Directed by: Ryoma Ouchida
- Written by: Anna Kawahara
- Studio: NTT Docomo
- Licensed by: Lemino
- Original run: May 19, 2023 – July 7, 2023
- Episodes: 8
- Anime television series
- Directed by: Shōta Ihata
- Written by: Wataru Watari
- Music by: Kana Hashiguchi
- Studio: Diomedéa
- Licensed by: Crunchyroll
- Original network: AT-X, Tokyo MX, BS NTV, MBS, NBC
- Original run: July 7, 2026 – September 22, 2026
- Episodes: 12
- icon

Young Ladies Don't Play Fighting Games (Japanese: 対ありでした。 ～お嬢さまは格闘ゲームなんてしない～, Hepburn: Tai Ari Deshita: Ojō-sama wa Kakutō Gēmu Nante Shinai; 'Thanks for the Match: Young Ladies Don't Play Fighting Games') is a Japanese manga series written and illustrated by Eri Ejima. It has been serialized in Media Factory's seinen manga magazine Monthly Comic Flapper since January 2020. The manga is licensed in North America by Seven Seas Entertainment.

The series follows a group of high school girls who secretly play fighting games together at a prestigious academy where video games are forbidden.

A live-action web drama adaptation aired from May to July 2023. An anime television series adaptation produced by Diomedéa aired from July to September 2026. The adaptations feature real life fighting games and brands in place of the original ones created for the manga, most prominently Capcom's Street Fighter series.

== Plot ==
Aya Mitsuki and Mio Yorue are high school students who attend Kuromi Girls' Academy, a prestigious all-girl school where video games are banned. Despite this, they discover that they are both avid fans of fighting games, and begin playing together in secret. The series follows the two as they bond through their rivalry and improve their skills, finding others who share their passion and entering tournaments, all while keeping their activities hidden from the academy's disciplinary committee.

== Characters ==
Aya Mitsuki (深月 綾, Mitsuki Aya)
Voiced by: Fairouz Ai (PV), Ikumi Hasegawa (anime)
Portrayed by: Mizuki Kayashima
A common girl who received entry into Kuromi Girls Academy via a scholarship. Aya has played fighting games since elementary school, but gave them up to attend Kuromi. Her passion is reignited upon meeting Mio, who has her own secret love of fighting games. Aya specializes in fast characters who are good at rushdown. In the live-action and anime adaptations, she mains Cammy in Street Fighter V and Street Fighter 6, respectively.

Mio Yorue (夜絵 美緒, Yorue Mio)
Voiced by: Rika Nagae (PV), Kana Ichinose (anime)
Portrayed by: Ririka Tanabe
The most popular girl at Kuromi Girls Academy, known as "Shirayuri-sama" (白百合さま; lit. 'White Lily') due to her elegance and beauty. Behind this persona, however, she is a ruthless hardcore gamer who is passionate for extreme competition. She is drawn to the main characters of fighting games when she plays. In the live-action and anime adaptations, she mains Ryu in Street Fighter V and Street Fighter 6, respectively.

Yuu Inui (犬井 夕, Inui Yū)
Voiced by: Sayaka Senbongi (anime)
Portrayed by: Akana Ikeda
A fun loving student and member of Kuromi's dorm disciplinary committee. She has loved fighting games since childhood. As such, she gets drawn to the girls playing. In the live-action and anime adaptations, she mains Ken in Street Fighter V and Street Fighter 6, respectively.

Tamaki Ichinose (一ノ瀬 珠樹, Ichinose Tamaki)
Voiced by: Shino Shimoji (anime)
Portrayed by: Riko Nagase
A strict member of the dorm disciplinary committee who hates to lose. She secretly practices fighting games in her room to impress her sister Hana. In the live-action and anime adaptations, she mains Juri in Street Fighter V and Street Fighter 6, respectively.

Arisa Fujimiya (藤宮 亜里沙, Fujimiya Arisa)
Voiced by: Maria Naganawa (anime)
Portrayed by: Hanna Tanaka
An ill-tempered elementary school student who devotes all her time to playing fighting games under the alias "Lesser Devil". She looks down on others who play casually or with friends. In the live-action and anime adaptations, she mains Guile in Street Fighter V and Street Fighter 6, respectively.

Hana Ichinose (一ノ瀬 花, Ichinose Hana)
Voiced by: Yumiri Hanamori (anime)
Portrayed by: Mei Tanaka
The stoic vice-chairwoman of the dorm disciplinary committee and a fighting game player who goes by "Bloody Macaron". She is Tamaki's older sister and treats her with scorn. In the anime adaptation, she mains A.K.I. in Street Fighter 6.

Morino Fujimiya (藤宮 森乃, Fujimiya Morino)
Voiced by: Saori Ōnishi (anime)
Portrayed by: Aina Yamada
The student council president and chairwoman of the dorm disciplinary committee. She is Arisa's older sister and frequently dotes on her.

Natsume Sakisaka (咲坂 なつめ, Sakisaka Natsume)
Voiced by: Saya Hitomi (anime)
Portrayed by: Mone Akitani
Aya's dorm roommate at Kuromi. She mistakenly believes Aya and Mio are dating and is supportive of the perceived relationship.

Gekido (激怒)
Voiced by: Nobuyuki Hiyama (anime)
A high-ranking professional fighting game player for the Tokyo Kobushi Gaming team. He has an intimidating appearance, resembling a biker gang member. In the anime adaptation, he mains Chun-Li in Street Fighter 6.

Cafeore (禍腐餌悪霊, Kafeore)
Voiced by: Yōhei Azakami (anime)
A newer member of the Tokyo Kobushi Gaming team. His name is derived from "café au lait". He views Gekido as his rival, maining the same character in the games they play.

Seshiru (星識)
Voiced by: Taku Yashiro (anime)
A professional gamer and livestreamer. He is a friend of Gekido who provides commentary over his matches.

Flamberge (フランベルジュ, Furanberuju)
Voiced by: Aru (anime)
A professional fighting game commentator. He provides commentary during the matches at the EXjp tournament, changed to EVO Japan in the anime adaptation.

== Media ==
=== Manga ===
Written and illustrated by Eri Ejima, Young Ladies Don't Play Fighting Games has been serialized in Media Factory's seinen manga magazine Monthly Comic Flapper since January 4, 2020, with eleven tankōbon volumes were released as of July 2026. Seven Seas Entertainment licensed the manga for an English release.

==== Volumes ====
No.	Original release date	Original ISBN	English release date	English ISBN
1	June 23, 2020	978-4-04-064613-8	September 28, 2021	978-1-64-827595-1
2	January 21, 2021	978-4-04-680151-7	December 7, 2021	978-1-64-827636-1
3	August 23, 2021	978-4-04-680664-2	September 27, 2022	978-1-63858-274-8
4	February 22, 2022	978-4-04-681150-9	November 11, 2022	978-1-63858-735-4
5	October 21, 2022	978-4-04-681795-2	May 23, 2023	978-1-68579-536-8
6	June 22, 2023	978-4-04-682519-3	March 5, 2024	979-8-88843-407-9
7	March 23, 2024	978-4-04-683428-7	December 17, 2024	979-8-89160-678-4
8	October 22, 2024	978-4-04-684091-2	September 30, 2025	979-8-89561-232-3
9	June 23, 2025	978-4-04-684829-1	April 21, 2026	979-8-89765-379-9
10	December 23, 2025	978-4-04-685427-8	—	—
11	July 22, 2026	978-4-04-660278-7	—	—

=== Drama ===
A live-action web drama adaptation was announced on October 21, 2022. It was directed by Ryoma Ouchida and written by Anna Kawahara. The series was streamed on the Lemino streaming service from May 19 to July 7, 2023, and ran for eight episodes. Iron Senpai 4, the fictional fighting game featured in the manga, was replaced by in-game footage of Capcom's Street Fighter V in the adaptation.

=== Anime ===
An anime adaptation was announced on January 21, 2021, which was later confirmed to be a television series produced by Diomedéa and directed by Shōta Ihata, with scripts written by Wataru Watari, characters designed by Mayuko Matsumoto, and music composed by Kana Hashiguchi. The series was originally scheduled to premiere in 2025, but was later delayed due to schedule adjustments of the various parties involved in production, and aired from July 7 to September 22, 2026, on AT-X and other networks. The opening theme song is "Inochi Mijikashi Tai Suru Otome yo!" (命短し対する乙女よ; "Life is Short, Fight Each Other, Maidens"), performed by Hanabie., while the ending theme song is "New Game", performed by Halca. Crunchyroll is streaming the series. Similar to the live-action series, the anime features in-game footage of Capcom's Street Fighter 6.

==== Episodes ====
No.	Title	Directed by (Note: Production staff information is taken from the ending credits of each episode.)	Written by	Storyboarded by	Original release date
1	"I'm Done With Fighting Games"; Transliteration: "Kaku Gē wa Mō Yameru" (Japanese: 格ゲーはもうやめる)	Shōta Ihata	Wataru Watari	Shōta Ihata	July 7, 2026
Aya Mitsuki is a new transfer student at Kuromi Girls Academy. She soon meets Mio Yorue, the school idol who embodies grace and femininity. Aya later finds Mio playing Street Fighter 6 in an empty classroom. Mio begs her not to tell anyone since gaming is prohibited at the academy. The next day, Aya notices Mio is constantly staring at her. They meet up later and, after examining the calluses on Aya's hands, Mio figures out that Aya is also a fighting game player. Aya admits she has been playing since Ultra Street Fighter IV, but eventually got bored with fighting games and gave them up, believing they conflict with the image of a proper lady. Mio begs Aya to play her in Street Fighter 6, and Aya eventually relents. In their first match, Aya, playing as Cammy, gets a perfect win against Mio, playing as Ryu. Aya wonders if Mio is a scrub, but after a few more rounds, Mio starts winning after using better tactics. Just then, they hear the school janitor coming and, with nowhere to hide, they jump out the window and flee. As they part ways, Aya reflects on why she played with Mio.
2	"Good Game"; Transliteration: "Tai Ari Deshita" (Japanese: 対ありでした)	Shōta Ihata & Ageha Kochōran	Wataru Watari	Shōta Ihata	July 14, 2026
Dorm disciplinary committee chair Morino Fujimiya announces that the window was smashed and a first-year's ribbon was found on site. When nobody confesses, she sentences all the first-years to a month of early morning clean-up duty. Later, with that classroom locked up, Aya asks her roommate Natsume Sakisaka to sleep in Mio's room so she and Mio can have their room. Natsume misunderstands the nature of their relationship and eagerly agrees to it. Aya and Mio then play Street Fighter 6. When they reach a score of 4–4, they hear someone walking by and quickly hide the laptop under the covers, and wind up laying in bed together. Afterward, they play one more match, which Aya wins. The next day, Mio approaches Aya in a park and challenges her to another match. This time Mio wins 5–1. Mio reveals she can train entirely in her head. Later, Mio admits she does not like her "Shirayuri-sama" nickname and asks Aya to call her by her name.
3	"Late-Night Locals"; Transliteration: "Mayonaka no Taisenkai" (Japanese: 真夜中の対戦会)	Ageha Kochōran	Sou Sagara	Shōta Ihata	July 21, 2026
Aya and Mio find an unused room in their dorm they can play in, but the dorm monitors, Yuu Inui and Tamaki Ichinose, catch them. However, they both turn out to be Street Fighter 6 players as well. While Tamaki initially threatens to report them anyway, Mio taunts her into a match; if Mio wins, Tamaki will not report them. In the end, Mio wins with ease, prompting Tamaki to request the others teach her how to play better. Seeing that Tamaki is a Juri mainer, Aya tells her to practice hit-confirming into the character's Level 3 Super Art. The girls continue playing until morning. Later, Yuu interrupts one of Aya and Mio's matches to point out that Tamaki is still practicing and has not gotten to play with them yet. Just then, Tamaki finally masters hit-confirming into Level 3 Super Arts, and Aya challenges her to play them.
4	"Late-Night Study Sessions"; Transliteration: "Mayonaka no Benkyōkai" (Japanese: 夜中の勉強会)	Shingo Tamaki	Sou Sagara	Shingo Tamaki	July 28, 2026
Mio is horrified to find out exams are coming up, fearing her grades will suffer because she spends so much time gaming she does not study. She tells the others she only entered the academy because her mother took her laptop hostage to force her to get in, the two even coming to blows over it, and she only later found out about the "no gaming" rule. The group take some time off from gaming as Aya helps tutor Mio, and she manages to pass her exams. Later, the group find out Evo Japan is coming up, and they all decide to sign up.
5	"The Night Before"; Transliteration: "Zenya" (Japanese: 前夜)	Keizō Kusakawa	Wataru Watari	Keizō Kusakawa	August 4, 2026
The girls are planning to take a trip to Tokyo in order to participate at Evo Japan. However, Mio is worried that her mother will not allow her to go, so she gets Aya to convince her. Paying a visit to Mio's house, Mio tells her mother that she wants to have fun with her friends in Tokyo. Once Mio shows her mother a perfect score on her exam, the latter grants the former permission to go to Tokyo. Upon arriving, the girls continue training for the tournament. Tamaki confides in Yuu on wanting to reach Aya and Mio's playing level, as Yuu tells her to loosen up. Elsewhere, professional player "Gekido", who is playing as Chun-Li, is surprised when a Guile mainer defeats him in a ranked match. His opponent is revealed to be Morino's younger sister, Arisa.
6	"A Noble Duel"; Transliteration: "Sūkōnaru Kettō" (Japanese: 崇高なる決闘)	Shōta Ihata	Shōta Ihata	Shōta Ihata	August 11, 2026
While training all night, Aya notices that Mio is not giving it her all in the game. The girls arrive at Evo Japan the following day, where Street Fighter 6, Tekken 8, and Guilty Gear Strive headline the event. They discuss their reasons for playing fighting games, when Arisa approaches and admonishes them for not taking it seriously enough. Once the Street Fighter 6 tournament begins, Tamaki takes on a man named Osogami. Elsewhere, Mio has an attack of nerves and loses her first match. As a result, she is placed in the losers bracket since it is a double-elimination tournament. Afterward, Yuu gives her a "good luck" charm that looks like Juri. Meanwhile, Gekido goes up against his teammate and fellow Chun-Li player "Cafeore" in a mirror match.
7	"The Lesser Devil"; Transliteration: "Chiisai Akuma" (Japanese: 小さい悪魔)	Shingo Tamaki	Jakuson Ō	Shingo Tamaki	August 18, 2026
After winning their respective first matches, Aya and Tamaki watch Gekido and Cafeore's match. Gekido wins and Cafeore is placed in the losers bracket. During lunchtime, Arisa remembers how she befriended a girl named Miyuki Nakamura in elementary school. Miyuki protected her from bullies, but severed their friendship following a Street Fighter V session. When the girls are backtalking about her and Mio tells her about not having any friends, Arisa gets triggered and scratches Mio's face. Their scuffle is halted when Hana, Tamaki's sister and the dorm committee's vice chair, appears under her alias "Bloody Macaron", while Arisa's alias is "Lesser Devil". Realizing that her own sister is a gamer as well, Tamaki is afraid to answer Hana, but Yuu defends her and tells Hana off. Soon after, the girls go back to participating in their respective matches, where Aya goes up against Gekido, while Mio confronts Cafeore.
8	"Guaranteed to Lose"; Transliteration: "Kakujitsu ni Makeru" (Japanese: 確実に負ける)	Keizō Kusakawa & Shingo Tamaki	Sou Sagara	Keizō Kusakawa	August 25, 2026
Aya goes up against Gekido and Yuu goes up against Arisa in the winners bracket, while Mio goes up against Cafeore in the losers bracket. Tamaki runs into Hana and they play an impromptu casual match. Hana, a A.K.I. player, wonders why Tamaki still plays fighting games; Tamaki replies that she does it because she wants to play against Hana's former self. Hana wins and expresses her disappointment that Tamaki is not taking things seriously. Despite having idolized Gekido and briefly believing she cannot win, Aya gives it her all and wins her first game against Gekido. In the losers bracket, Mio, despite initially spamming Ryu's Hadouken, wins her first game against Cafeore.
9	"Playing for Fun"; Transliteration: "Asobi no Purei" (Japanese: 遊びのプレイ)	Shōta Ihata & Shingo Tamaki	Sou Sagara	Shōta Ihata	September 1, 2026
Cafeore is shocked that Mio defeated him in the first game of their match and vows he will not hold back anymore. In her match against Arisa, Yuu has Ken avoid Guile's Sonic Boom and does a combo. However, it is not enough to secure her win, as Arisa defeats Yuu and declares her to be "weak". Yuu tries to contact Tamaki, but gets no response. Elsewhere, Aya is struggling in her match against Gekido, and despite going all out after hitting herself with her arcade controller, she loses. However, an impressed Gekido wants to face her again sometime. Afterward, Aya rushes to Mio's match against Cafeore as the final round begins.
10	"But I Did Think It"; Transliteration: "Sō Omotta nda" (Japanese: そう思ったんだ)	Shingo Tamaki	Wataru Watari	Shingo Tamaki	September 8, 2026
Aya catches up to Mio playing against Cafeore in the final round. After carefully reading the inputs, Mio defeats Cafeore, thus eliminating him from the tournament. While they are outside, Aya realizes she admires Mio. Meanwhile, Tamaki is still shaken by Hana's words and unable to respond to Yuu's text messages. Elsewhere, Arisa is outraged on being placed in the losers bracket after losing to a Zangief player. Arisa sorrowfully recalls how Miyuki, who was good at fighting games, invited her to a friendly Street Fighter V match. Arisa admitted to being a beginner, so she practiced extensively alone in time for their session. Arisa won against Miyuki, but an angry Miyuki ended their friendship believing Arisa lied about her beginner skills to humiliate her. After regaining her composure, Arisa is paired against Mio on the main stage.
11	"The Beast"; Transliteration: "Bīsuto" (Japanese: 獣(ビースト))	Shōta Ihata	Wataru Watari	Shōta Ihata	September 15, 2026
Mio goes up against Arisa on stream. They begin the first game spamming Ryu's Hadouken and Guile's Sonic Boom, which eventually leads to Arisa cornering Mio. Despite making a comeback, Mio narrowly loses the first round via Time Over. Arisa then secures the first game after defeating Mio in the second round. A furious Arisa decides to be more vicious. However, Mio wins the second game. With the score tied 1–1, Arisa decides she will accept Mio so she can defeat her, declaring she is going to give it her all. Tamaki eventually returns inside to watch Mio's match. During the final round of the third game, Arisa has a vision of herself walking down a dark tunnel alone until she sees Mio standing in front of her.
12	"Good Luck, Have Fun!"; Transliteration: "Tai Yoro Desu!" (Japanese: 対よろです！)	Shōta Ihata	Wataru Watari	Shōta Ihata	September 22, 2026
Both Mio and Arisa give it their all during the final round of the third game. Meanwhile, Aya runs away when she sees herself being replaced by Arisa as Mio's main rival. In the end, Arisa defeats Mio, thus eliminating Mio from the tournament. Mio then passes out after she and Arisa show good sportsmanship to each other. The girls go back to playing Street Fighter 6 at night once they return to the academy. Tamaki and Yuu proceed to leave the room where they agree to get better together. Back in the room, Aya wants to talk to Mio. However, realizing that actions speak louder than words, Aya challenges Mio to a session, which is accepted.
