= Parallel World Pharmacy =

Japanese light novel series

- First light novel volume cover

異世界薬局 (Isekai Yakkyoku)
- Genre: Isekai; Medical
- Novel series
- Written by: Liz Takayama
- Published by: Shōsetsuka ni Narō
- Original run: July 2015 – September 2023
- Light novel
- Written by: Liz Takayama
- Illustrated by: keepout
- Published by: Media Factory
- Imprint: MF Books
- Original run: January 2016 – January 2024
- Volumes: 10
- Manga
- Written by: Liz Takayama
- Illustrated by: Sei Takano
- Published by: Kadokawa Shoten
- English publisher: NA: One Peace Books
- Magazine: ComicWalker
- Original run: November 2016 – present
- Volumes: 10
- Anime television series
- Directed by: Keizō Kusakawa
- Produced by: Hajime Maruyama; Kouji Sawahata; Toshinori Fujiwara; Nao Matsumura; Masashi Hirayama
- Written by: Wataru Watari
- Music by: Tatsuya Kato; Satoshi Hōno
- Studio: Diomedéa
- Licensed by: Crunchyroll (streaming); SA/SEA: Muse Communication
- Original network: AT-X, Tokyo MX, Kansai TV, BS NTV
- English network: SEA: Animax Asia
- Original run: July 10, 2022 – September 25, 2022
- Episodes: 12
- icon

Parallel World Pharmacy (Japanese: 異世界薬局, Hepburn: Isekai Yakkyoku; lit. 'Alternate World Pharmacy') is a Japanese light novel series written by Liz Takayama and illustrated by keepout. It was serialized online from July 2015 to September 2023 on the user-generated novel publishing website Shōsetsuka ni Narō. It was later acquired by Media Factory, who published ten volumes from January 2016 to January 2024 under their MF Books imprint. A manga adaptation with art by Sei Takano has been serialized online via Kadokawa Shoten's ComicWalker website since November 2016. It has been collected in eight tankōbon volumes. One Peace Books licensed the manga adaption for English release in North America, with the first volume released in May 2023. An anime television series adaptation by Diomedéa aired from July to September 2022.

== Synopsis ==
In his life-long obsession to develop new medicines to help people, Kanji Yakutani, a Japanese medical researcher, dies from overwork. To his immense surprise, he finds himself reborn in another world with a medieval culture, in which proper medical treatments are a privilege affordable only to the wealthy. In his new life as Farma de Médicis, he discovers that he has been granted a divine blessing from Panactheos, the God of Medicine. With his divine blessing and his retained knowledge of modern medicine, Farma decides to revolutionize the other world's medical advancements and make proper treatments affordable for the common folk. But as one medical emergency follows another, Farma also has to learn what it means to really live in his new life.

== Characters ==
Farma de Médicis (ファルマ・ド・メディシス, Faruma do Medishisu)
Voiced by: Aki Toyosaki (Japanese); Morgan Lea (English)
A 10-year-old boy who is the otherworldly reincarnation of Kanji Yakutani, a world-famous medical researcher at T University who created countless medical advances and medicines to counter any sickness. After losing his younger sister Chi to an incurable brain tumor during his childhood, Yakutani became obsessed with pharmaceutical research and development of new medicines, which he did exemplary. This drive caused him to die from heart attack due to overwork and fatigue at the age of 31, but he is reincarnated into a medieval world into the renowned de Médicis noble family in the San Fleuve Empire. When he awakens in his reincarnated self, he was told he was previously in a coma due to being struck by lightning and is now acting differently than how he used to be prior to the incident. The Divine Art bestowed upon him allows Farma to create water and, thanks to his knowledge in chemistry, other basic elements, and to perceive medical anomalies, but he was given Elementless ability, which is quite rare, unlike the original Farma who used only Water based spells and skills. He bears a scar on his shoulder as a visible sign of his blessing by Panactheos, and he no longer casts a shadow, which was solved when the Church's bishop gave him an artifact to produce a shadow, alongside the church's hidden staff that only usable by the person blessed and made Apostle by the Medicine God.
Eléonore "Ellen" Bonnefoi (エレオノール･ボヌフォワ, Ereonōru Bonufowa)
Voiced by: Reina Ueda (Japanese); Trisha Mellon (English)
Farma's personal tutor and a talented pharmacist who passed her first-grade exam at the age of fifteen. Has so many glasses to replace those she lost. She joins her student in building his dreams.
Charlotte "Lotte" Soller (シャルロット･ソレル, Sharurotto Soreru)
Voiced by: Kaede Hondo (Japanese); Lindsay Seidel (English)
A 9-year-old maid servant of the de Médicis family and Farma's childhood friend. Later on, she joins her master as a pharmacy clerk. Her natural talent at painting later gets her a royal sponsorship by Empress Elizabeth as an artist.
Empress Elisabeth II (エリザベート二世, Erizabēto Nisei)
Voiced by: Shizuka Itō (Japanese); Marti Etheridge (English)
Ruler of the San Fleuve Empire. After Farma saves her from the – previously believed incurable – "white sickness", she gives the de Médicis honors and allows Farma to build his dream pharmacy. Her Divine Art is Fire, but her divine mark is incomplete, giving her less power.
Bruno de Médicis (ブリュノ・ド・メディシス, Buryuno do Medishisu)
Voiced by: Kenji Nomura (Japanese); Chris Ryan (English)
The patriarch of the de Médicis family, an archduke, and Farma's father. He is also the president of the Sain Fleuve's Imperial School of Pharmacy, and later the governor of the port of Marseirre. At first, he does not trust the reborn Farma until the latter shows his worth by healing the Empress with his unusual medical knowledge. Like Farma, his Divine Skill is with Water. A brilliant pharmacist in his own right, he is, however, hobbled by the limitations of his world's medical knowledge.
Blanche de Médicis (ブランシュ・ド・メディシス, Buranshu do Medishisu)
Voiced by: Maria Naganawa (Japanese); Ariel Graham (English)
Farma's 4-year-old younger sister, whom Farma healed from her chickenpox.
Salomon (サロモン, Saromon)
Voiced by: Hiroshi Tsuchida (Japanese); Bradley Gareth (English)
A high-ranking inquisitor, and later archbishop, of the Diocese of Panactheos, the leading religious order of the San Fleuve Empire. Initially antagonistic towards Farma, believing him to be a demon, he has since become a close ally after Farma has proven his worth.
Camus de Sade (カミュ・ド・サド, Kamyu do Sado)
Voiced by: Kazuya Nakai
A former pharmacist and member of the Imperial School of Pharmacy, and a former friend of Bruno de Médicis. While a genius in the field of infectious diseases, he is amoral and twisted. For conducting abominable experiments on live human subjects, he was branded by the Diocese, which sealed his Divine Art away, and banished from San Fleuve.
Veron (ベロン, Beron)
Voiced by: Yasuhiro Mamiya
The master of the Saint Fleuve Pharmaceutist Guild, the only institution in the empire for licensing pharmacists in the empire until Farma succeeds in winning Empress Elizabeth's favor. Mostly out of jealousy, he begins sabotaging Farma's efforts to open apothecaries for the common people, resorting to even outright vicious methods. During the Black Death incident, he and the other guild leaders stubbornly refuse to accept Farma's cures and therefore all die from the disease; this and the ineffectiveness of their traditional remedies causes the lower guild ranks to flock to Farma for assistance, which is readily given.

== Production ==
Yūshi Kojima, who is a pharmacist, joined the production of the manga adaptation as a "pharmacy supervisor" in 2022.

== Media ==
=== Light novels ===
No.	Japanese release date	Japanese ISBN
1	January 25, 2016	978-4-04-068047-7
2	May 25, 2016	978-4-04-068320-1
3	October 25, 2016	978-4-04-068672-1
4	March 25, 2017	978-4-04-069088-9
5	August 25, 2017	978-4-04-069409-2
6	March 24, 2018	978-4-04-069806-9
7	July 25, 2019	978-4-04-065838-4
8	July 21, 2021	978-4-04-064268-0
9	December 23, 2022	978-4-04-682021-1
10	January 25, 2024	978-4-04-683252-8

=== Manga ===
No.	Original release date	Original ISBN	English release date	English ISBN
1	March 23, 2017	978-4-04-069116-9	May 30, 2023	978-1-64-273244-3
2	September 23, 2017	978-4-04-069419-1	November 21, 2023	978-1-64-273289-4
3	May 23, 2018	978-4-04-069836-6	December 19, 2023	978-1-64-273290-0
4	February 22, 2019	978-4-04-065350-1	April 23, 2024	978-1-64-273345-7
5	October 21, 2019	978-4-04-064070-9	September 24, 2024	978-1-64-273397-6
6	September 23, 2020	978-4-04-064768-5	November 19, 2024	978-1-64-273398-3
7	July 21, 2021	978-4-04-680506-5	August 14, 2025	978-1-64-273490-4
8	March 22, 2022	978-4-04-681251-3	—	—
9	January 23, 2023	978-4-04-682167-6	—	—
10	December 21, 2023	978-4-04-683105-7	—	—
11	October 23, 2024	978-4-04-683947-3	—	—
12	October 23, 2025	978-4-04-685195-6	—	—

=== Anime ===
An anime television series adaptation was announced on July 15, 2021. The series is produced by Diomedéa and directed by Keizō Kusakawa, with Wataru Watari in charge of series' scripts, Mayuko Matsumoto designing the characters, and Tatsuya Kato and Satoshi Hōno composing the music. It aired from July 10 to September 25, 2022, on AT-X, Tokyo MX, Kansai TV, and BS NTV. The opening theme song is "Musō-teki Chronicle" by Kaori Ishihara, while the ending theme song is "Haku'u" by Little Black Dress. Crunchyroll streamed the series outside of Asia, with an English dub premiering on July 24, 2022. Muse Communication licensed the series in Taiwan, South Asia, and Southeast Asia.

==== Episode list ====
No.	Title	Directed by	Written by	Storyboarded by	Original release date
1	"A Reincarnated Pharmacologist and a Parallel World"; Transliteration: "Tensei Yakugakusha to Isekai" (Japanese: 転生薬学者と異世界)	Keizō Kusakawa	Wataru Watari	Keizō Kusakawa	July 10, 2022
Kanji Yukatani works obsessively as a pharmacist, creating cures for diseases in memory of his sister who died from a tumour. He dies in his sleep from overwork, but abruptly awakens in an alternate world as a boy named Farma de Medicis whose family, the de Medicis, serve the royal family as doctors. Farma is shocked to learn that magic known as Divine Arts exists in this new world, and upon testing his powers, finds that he can summon all the elements of the periodic table using his knowledge of chemistry. Playing on the idea he has amnesia, he convinces his father Bruno to let him return to studying with his tutor Eleonore. He learns Divine Arts encompass Earth, Air, Fire, Water and None, but None is extinct. He also learns no one can summon all the elements, and someone who can would be judged unnatural, so he keeps his skill hidden. Eleonore discovers that next to his odd change in his personality, Farma's magical capacity has increased almost to infinity, he possesses the Divine Eye that can detect all illness and injury, and his body no longer casts a shadow. Eleonore flees, believing him to be a monster.
2	"Master and Apprentice"; Transliteration: "Shishō to Deshi" (Japanese: 師匠と弟子)	Shōta Ihata	Sō Sagara	Shōta Ihata	July 17, 2022
Farma visits Eleonore at her home but finds her terrified as she believes him to be the Panactheos, one of the Gods who rule over the Divine Arts. Farma asks her to return to being his tutor, as he is still a novice, but will leave her alone if she wishes. Eleonore remembers the Panactheos is a benevolent being, so she stops being scared. Practicing with the Divine Eye, Farma begins diagnosing and creating treatments for the household's servants, but after Charlotte explains the de Medici's only serve royalty and medicines from commoner doctors are expensive, he decides to make medicine available for all social classes. Farma's sister Blanche contracts chickenpox; Farma creates a treatment using techniques from Earth, but as no one in this world knows of these treatments, he makes Blanche promise to keep it secret. Bruno is surprised at Blanche's quick recovery, but doesn't seem suspicious. To better use his Divine Eye, Farma creates a pocket sized Leeuwenhoek microscope. Bruno summons Farma to join him in providing treatment to the Empress herself.
3	"The Chief Royal Pharmacian and the Reincarnated Pharmacologist"; Transliteration: "Hittō Kyūtei Kusushi to Tensei Yakugakusha" (Japanese: 筆頭宮廷薬師と転生薬学者)	Shingo Tamaki	Wataru Watari	Shingo Tamaki	July 24, 2022
Farma and Bruno visit Empress Elisabeth, and Bruno concludes Elisabeth's condition will soon be fatal. Farma secretly uses Divine Eye and diagnoses her with White Death, so he claims to Elizabeth before all her physicians that he can save her. Bruno angrily claims no cure for the White Death exists, so Farma realizes and reveals Bruno is also suffering from the disease in its early stages. Bruno attacks Farma, but Farma stops him with an ice wall, revealing his new powers. Bruno realises Farma is no longer the son he once knew and is convinced the Panactheos sent Farma medicinal revelations. Using his pocket microscope, Farma proves to the court physicians that Elisabeth has tiny creatures in her lungs and explains the existence of bacteria. Convinced, Elisabeth agrees to take Farma's medicine for the six months required. Returning home, Bruno re-examines his own approach to medicine, as well as his failings as a parent. Farma asks Bruno to continue teaching him, as despite his powers he must still learn to be a doctor. Surprised, Bruno agrees, accepts Farma is still his son, and takes the medicine to cure his own tuberculosis.
4	"The Empress and an Imperial Charter"; Transliteration: "Kōtei Heika to Sōgyō Chokkyo" (Japanese: 皇帝陛下と創業勅許)	Keizō Kusakawa; Yoshino Honda	Wataru Watari	Yoshino Honda	July 31, 2022
Farma's treatment of Elisabeth is hailed as a miracle, but Bruno warns his knowledge could be seen as heresy and that someone may have infected Elisabeth on purpose. Noah, a page in Elisabeth's court, informs Farma that Elisabeth intends to reward him, and Farma decides he wants to open a pharmacy that treats nobles and commoners. Elisabeth worries she is unfit to rule due to Farma's powers exceeding her own until Farma convinces her she is still needed. Months later, with Elisabeth completely recovered; Bruno is awarded new lands, and Farma is promoted to Royal Pharmacist and allowed to open a pharmacy in the capital. Farma designs his ideal pharmacy, but due to talking to himself and other miscommunications, the pharmacy is accidentally named Parallel World Pharmacy. Almost immediately, Veron, head of the Saint Fleuve Pharmaceutist Guild, attempts to undermine Farma and is furious to learn his medicines will be cheap enough for commoners, but he is scared away by Eleonore before he can cause trouble. Farma hires Charlotte as errand-girl, but still requires someone to manage accounts and paperwork. Coincidentally, Bruno retires his own accountant Cedric due to his failing ability to walk, so Farma hires Cedric while promising to treat his legs. Bruno gives Farma a fortune in gold to help get the pharmacy going. Farma correctly deduces Bruno deliberately retired Cedric to allow Farma to hire him, and is grateful.
5	"Daily Life at Parallel World Pharmacy and Cosmetics"; Transliteration: "Isekai Yakkyoku no Nichijō to Keshōhin" (Japanese: 異世界薬局の日常と化粧品)	Ageha Kochōran	Jakuson Ō	Sorato Shimizu	August 7, 2022
In his first month Farma has only one customer, a sailor named Jean who buys sweets made to cure scurvy. Bruno and Farma's mother Beatrice visit, and Beatrice suggests selling cosmetics, but Bruno adamantly opposes face powder as ladies who use it invariably die young. Farma is impressed Bruno noticed, since primitive makeup often contains lead, which is toxic when applied to skin. Farma suddenly receives a customer, the noble Chloe de Chatillon. He diagnoses her with anemia caused by bloodletting, a primitive procedure to make skin paler. Farma creates a non-toxic makeup that moisturises and prevents sunburn, with which Chloe is thrilled. Farma is soon swamped by customers desperate for makeup of noble quality that is affordable. Chloe is so thankful, she offers to finance a separate shop focused solely on cosmetics, with Farma as manager and staffed by young female pharmacists who all lost jobs due to having children. Farma institutes policies of maternity leave, which earns him the ladies' instant loyalty. Elizabeth is entranced by the new makeup, especially lip gloss, and passes a law to ban the selling of lead-based makeup. She also advises selling his makeup recipes to the noble shops that her new law will put out of business, and to slightly raise the price of his medicines so as not to put commoner pharmacists out of business by mistake, both pieces of advice Farma realises he should have thought of himself.
6	"Siblings and the Sea"; Transliteration: "Kyōdai to Umi" (Japanese: 兄妹と海)	Shōta Amano	Sō Sagara	Keizō Kusakawa	August 14, 2022
Farma and his family visit Bruno's new lands, the Duchy of Marseirre's, which includes ports and farmland. At the beach, Farma reminisces about his past life, visiting the beach in Japan with his sister Chi. Blanche is suddenly swept away by a rip current. Farma swims after her and in his desperation, activates his powers which split the ocean and allows him to carry Blanche to safety along the ocean floor. Eleonore is shocked as Farma's power was clearly a Negative-Attribute divine art; he didn't move the water, he deleted it from existence, which is impossible. Unfortunately, a witness informs the Holy Diocese, and orders are sent to every temple to locate the boy with no shadow and assassinate him for heresy. Farma returns to his pharmacy where two priests watch him. The next morning a horse and carriage breaks into the pharmacy, destroys their medicines and fills the shop with deep mud. Bruno suspects someone is targeting the de Medici family. Farma is touched when Jean and his crew, grateful for his anti-scurvy sweets, arrive to help clean up along with other shop owners who volunteer as good neighbours. A woman suddenly arrives claiming her father is unwell. Farma leaves to treat him, but is lured to a deserted field, where he is confronted by a Diocese Inquisitor.
7	"The Boy with No Shadow and the Inquisitors"; Transliteration: "Kage no Nai Shōnen to Itanjinmonkan" (Japanese: 影のない少年と異端審問官)	Shōta Ihata	Sō Sagara	Shōta Ihata	August 21, 2022
Grand Inquisitor Salomon and his fellow priests attack Farma, believing him to be an evil spirit in human guise, but Farma easily wards off their magical assaults while pleading to them that he means no harm to anyone. Once they see the mark of the Panactheos on him, they interpret him as an incarnation of their own deity and desist. Farma prevents Salomon from committing suicide to atone for his "sin" of attacking him and performs emergency surgery to mend the Inquisitor's leg, which was severely broken during the attack. Months later, Salomon, fully recovered and promoted to bishop, visits Farma and takes a tour of the pharmacy, assuring Farma that he will keep his existence secret from the Diocese in gratitude for saving his life. He also brings several gifts, including a set of pastries, a divine staff named the Panac-Rabdos, and a talisman which suppresses Farma's Divine Art aura, allowing him to cast a shadow. With the threat by the Diocese gone, but with the Saint Fleuve guild refusing to grant him the right to publicly sell his treatments, Farma decides to found a new guild with other medicine stores. The same night, Marie, daughter of Pierre, a young pharmacy store owner and member of Saint Fleuve Guild, falls gravely ill.
8	"Influenza and the Dawn of a Pharmacy"; Transliteration: "Infuruenza to Yakkyoku no Yoake" (Japanese: インフルエンザと薬局の夜明け)	Shingo Tamaki	Wataru Watari	Shingo Tamaki	August 28, 2022
Enraged that his efforts to ruin Farma have failed, Veron forbids his guildmembers from having anything to do with the shop. Pierre fails to find a doctor who will help Marie, until Farma invites them to his pharmacy and gives Marie, who has contracted influenza, excellent care and affordable prices despite their lower class. Returning home, Pierre realises Farma is the pinnacle of what a pharmacist should be, but he is stuck obeying the guild for the sake of his family. Veron is further enraged with the news that Farma is protected by Elizabeth and Salomon. Pierre admits he took Marie to Farma and that Saint Fleuve should be learning from him, not despising him. Veron reveals one of his children died because a noble doctor refused to treat him, so he will never trust Farma. Pierre is expelled from the guild, his pharmacist licence revoked and his shop destroyed. Upon learning this, Farma invites Pierre to join the Compounding Pharmacy Guild he recently set up with Elizabeth's permission, allowing Pierre to continue working as a pharmacist. With the support of his wife and daughter, Pierre learns Farma's diagnostic techniques and stocks only Farma's advanced medicines before opening his new shop, the Dawn Pharmacy.
9	"The Story of a Certain Wicked Man"; Transliteration: "Aru Jaaku na Otoko no Hanashi" (Japanese: ある邪悪な男の話)	Yoshino Honda	Sō Sagara	Yoshino Honda	September 4, 2022
Empress Elisabeth reviews the positive impacts of Parallel World Pharmacy on public health and therefore the Empire's prosperity, and decides to continue assisting Farma's endeavors. Bruno de Médicis is painfully reminded of Camus de Sade, his former peer and friend who was banished for conducting abominable medical experiments on human subjects. He receives a letter from his older son Palle announcing the appearance of a strange, deadly epidemic originating from Pante Island, from which wares are imported that may contaminate the upcoming annual Saint Fleuve Fair at the Imperial capital. Bruno asks Farma to investigate, and from the available descriptions, Farma identifies the disease as the Black Death. Farma, Bruno and Elizabeth immediately initiate quarantine and medical precautions with the help of their fellow students and pharmacists, before Farma and Eléonore depart for Marseirre, where the wares from Pante are supposed to arrive. But meanwhile, Camus has returned to the capital, cloaked in an ominous dark aura.
10	"The Black Death"; Transliteration: "Kokushibyō" (Japanese: 黒死病)	Ageha Kochōran	Jakuson Ō	Sorato Shimizu	September 11, 2022
Upon their arrival in Marseirre, Farma and Eléonore begin inspecting the merchant ships that are impatiently waiting to make landfall, assisted by Saint Fleuve's naval forces, whose leader is Commodore Jean Alain Gabain, Farma's old regular for scurvy cure candy. While no outbreaks have occurred in the port itself, Farma receives news that a village named L'Estacque was struck by the plague after a ship had illegally docked there to avoid the quarantine. Riding the Panac-Rabdos, Farma departs for L'Estacque alone and arrives just in time to prevent some desperate villagers from leaving and thus spreading the infection. With his rank as a Royal Pharmacist, he rallies the survivors and organizes treatment measures in the town, and after initial preparations are completed, he enters the section in which the most critical cases have been isolated. Commodore Gabin sinks the renegade ship after it is found with all hands dead.
11	"The Miracle at L'Estacque"; Transliteration: "Esutāku Mura no Kiseki" (Japanese: エスターク村の奇跡)	Shōta Ihata	Wataru Watari	Shōta Ihata	September 18, 2022
Farma's team, with the aid of several Diocese members, works hard in preventing an outbreak of the Black Death, but realizes that they will need more assistance. Professor Ruth Gaspard, a specialist for the taxodomy of fungi and microorganisms at the Imperial School of Pharmacy, is nearing her mandatory retirement when Bruno asks her to assist Farma in developing antibiotics which can be produced without the need for a Divine Art. The Diocese intercepts several crew members from the rogue ship who have made landfall with some of their cargo, and Farma learns that not only did they bring some rare white squirrels from Pante which would act as plague-carriers, but also five Holy Knights from Nederland who boarded in the midst of the ship's voyage. Connecting the dots to Elisabeth's illness, Farma and Bruno conclude that someone is plotting to eradicate the Saint Fleuve Empire using virulent diseases. This theory is validated the next morning when the wanted knights suddenly breach the capital's gates and release a huge number of white squirrels into the city.
12	"Those He Couldn't Cure"; Transliteration: "Kare ga Naosenakatta Mono" (Japanese: 彼が治せなかったもの)	Keizō Kusakawa	Wataru Watari	Keizō Kusakawa; Sorato Shimizu	September 25, 2022
As Bruno and Elisabeth discuss the crisis, they suspect that Camus has his hands in the outbreak by killing the king of Nederland and using the nation's resources to take revenge on Saint Fleuve for his banishment. Bishop Salomon stops the enemy knights, who confirm Camus' involvement, but the infection has spread quickly all over the city because the squirrels carrying the plague can fly. Farma returns to the capital and reunites with his father, but Camus infiltrates Parallel World Pharmacy and stabs Cedric and Lotte with a poisoned dagger. Farma and Bruno arrive, and while Bruno fights Camus, Farma purges the poison from his friends. When Camus overcomes Bruno, Farma fights back and employs his Divine Art and the Panac-Rabdos' power to destroy Camus and the demonic power which possessed him. Following this, the outbreak is swiftly quelled, and Farma's successes inspire a rapid advancement in medical research. The Saint Fleuve Festival proceeds as planned, and Parallel World Pharmacy once again opens for business.

== Reception ==
The light novel and manga together has had over 2.3 million copies in circulation.

== See also ==
- Reincarnated as a Neglected Noble, another light novel series illustrated by keepout
- Reincarnated as the Daughter of the Legendary Hero and the Queen of Spirits, another light novel series illustrated by keepout
