= Girlish Number =

2016 Japanese multimedia project

- Girlish Number novel volume 1 cover

ガーリッシュナンバー (Gārisshu Nanbā)
- Genre: Comedy, Slice of life
- Serial novel
- Written by: Wataru Watari
- Illustrated by: QP:flapper, Yamcha
- Published by: ASCII Media Works
- Magazine: Dengeki G's Magazine
- Original run: January 30, 2016 – May 30, 2017
- Volumes: 3
- Manga
- Written by: Wataru Watari
- Illustrated by: Yūki Dōmoto
- Published by: ASCII Media Works
- English publisher: MY: Kadokawa Gempak Starz
- Magazine: Dengeki G's Comic
- Original run: March 30, 2016 – May 30, 2017
- Volumes: 3
- Anime television series
- Directed by: Shōta Ihata
- Produced by: Mitsutoshi Ogura; Junichirou Tanaka; Atsushi Aitani; Tsuyoshi Aida; Kazuhiro Kanemitsu; Toshiyasu Hayashi; Hironobu Takashima
- Written by: Wataru Watari
- Music by: Tomoki Kikuya
- Studio: Diomedéa
- Licensed by: AUS: Madman Entertainment; NA: Sentai Filmworks; UK: MVM Entertainment
- Original network: TBS, BS-TBS, Sun TV, TUT
- English network: SEA: Animax Asia
- Original run: October 7, 2016 – December 23, 2016
- Episodes: 12

Girlish Number (ガーリッシュナンバー, Gārisshu Nanbā; stylized as gi(a)rlish number) (Note: Gārisshu can be the Japanese transcription of both "girlish" or "garish".) is a Japanese multimedia project. It launched in the March 2016 issue of ASCII Media Works' Dengeki G's Magazine as a serial novel written by Wataru Watari, with illustrations by QP:flapper and Yamcha. A manga series drawn by Yūki Dōmoto is serialized in Dengeki G's Comic, and a 12-episode anime television series by Diomedéa aired from October to December 2016.

== Plot ==
The story revolves around Chitose Karasuma, a voice actress who has been working in the anime industry for a year. Although she believes she is talented, she thinks the anime industry is rotten as she has only been voicing minor characters. One day, an opportunity arises for her to voice a main role in an upcoming anime adaptation of a light novel as an idol voice actress with four other girls.

== Characters ==
Chitose Karasuma (烏丸 千歳, Karasuma Chitose)
Voiced by: Sayaka Senbongi
Chitose is a university student and aspiring voice actress whose agency is Number One Produce. She is the voice of Yuna, one of the five main heroines in the upcoming anime series Millennium Princess × Kowloon Overlord. She has a positive attitude and high confidence, and initially thinks that she has talent for voice acting but just did not get enough chances. However this is in contrast with her being very cynical. She is nicknamed "Chii-sama".
Yae Kugayama (久我山 八重, Kugayama Yae)
Voiced by: Kaede Hondo
Yae is an aspiring voice actress at Number One Produce who went to the same voice actress school as Chitose. She is the voice of Mao in Millennium Princess × Kowloon Overlord. She is nicknamed "Yae-pon". Yae is shy and admires Chitose as a fellow voice actress, but sometimes she says some harsh truths without realizing it.
Koto Katakura (片倉 京, Katakura Koto)
Voiced by: Yui Ishikawa
Koto is a 26-year-old voice actress at Number One Produce who speaks in a Kansai dialect who entered the agency at the same time as Gojō. She is also an otaku. She is the voice of Ria in Millennium Princess × Kowloon Overlord.
Momoka Sonō (苑生 百花, Sonō Momoka)
Voiced by: Eri Suzuki
Momoka is a high school student. She is a musician and idol voice actress at Voice Enterprise. Her father is a famous director and her mother is well-known voice actress Sakura Sonō. She is the voice of Yuzu in Millennium Princess × Kowloon Overlord.
Kazuha Shibasaki (柴崎 万葉, Shibasaki Kazuha)
Voiced by: Saori Ōnishi
Kazuha is a voice actress at Iroha Production in her mid 20s. She wants to be cast in a serious anime series. She is the voice of Nanaka in Millennium Princess × Kowloon Overlord. When drunk, she speaks in her original accent, Yamagata dialect.
Nanami Sakuragaoka (桜ヶ丘 七海, Sakuragaoka Nanami)
Voiced by: Amina Satō
A high school student in the same agency as Chitose who greatly admires her.
Kuzu-P (九頭P)
Voiced by: Kazuya Nakai
Kuzu-P (Kuzu Producer) is a producer who is in charge of the planning and production of the anime series Millennium Princess × Kowloon Overlord. He does not seem to care about the quality of an anime as long as money is made.
Gojō Karasuma (烏丸 悟浄, Karasuma Gojō)
Voiced by: Yūichirō Umehara
Gojō is Chitose's older brother and a manager of Number One Produce. He was a talented voice actor, despite one of his drama CDs selling practically nothing. He quit his job as a voice actor after getting a big role.
Towada AP (十和田AP)
Voiced by: Takuya Eguchi
He is an assistant producer and direct subordinate of Kuzu. Unlike his boss, he is more serious with his job. He often gets dragged into trouble made by Kuzu-P and has to cover up for Kuzu's slacking off.
Namba (難波)
Voiced by: Kenyuu Horiuchi
He is the president of the Number One Produce who has an energetic personality and shares a similar carefree and reckless personality like Kuzu-P. He also shares Kuzu-P's utter indifference to the quality of his company's anime, having begun the novel's plot simply because he was vaguely aware that light novels and adaptations of them were in vogue and therefore decided to try and cash in while he still could.

== Media ==
=== Print ===
A serial novel written by Wataru Watari was serialized in ASCII Media Works' Dengeki G's Magazine from the March 2016. to the July 2017 issues. The novel features illustrations by Yamcha, except for the colored pages which are illustrated by QP:flapper, who also provided the original character designs. ASCII Media Works published three volumes from July 27, 2016 to June 26, 2017.

A manga series, written by Watari and illustrated by Yūki Dōmoto, was serialized in ASCII Media Works' Dengeki G's Comic between the April 2016 and July 2017 issues. ASCII Media Works release three tankōbon volumes from July 27, 2016 to June 26, 2017. A spin-off four-panel comic strip manga series, titled Girlish Number Shura (ガーリッシュ ナンバー 修羅) and illustrated by Shin Ikezawa and Yū Tsurusaki, was serialized online by Dengeki G's Magazine from August 15 to November 26, 2016; a single volume was released on November 26, 2016. Another spin-off manga, titled Girlish Number Momoka Memorial (ガーリッシュ ナンバー momoka memorial) and illustrated by Mami Surada, was serialized in Dengeki G's Comic from the September to December 2016 issues; a single volume was released on November 26, 2016.

=== Anime ===
A 12-episode anime television series, produced by Diomedéa and directed by Shōta Ihata, premiered on October 7, 2016. The opening theme is "Bloom" and the ending theme is "Ima wa Mijikashi Yumemiyo Otome" (今は短し夢見よ乙女); both songs are sung by Girlish Number, a group made up of Sayaka Senbongi, Kaede Hondo, Yui Ishikawa, Eri Suzuki and Saori Ōnishi. The opening theme of the first episode is "Ketsui no Dia" (決意のダイヤ) sung by Kohaluna, a fictional unit made up of Momoka Sonō (Suzuki) and Kazuha Shibasaki (Ōnishi). The series was released on six DVD and Blu-ray compilation volumes from December 21, 2016, to May 26, 2017. The anime has been licensed by Sentai Filmworks, and is streamed by Hulu, Anime Network, and Crunchyroll. Madman Entertainment streamed the series on AnimeLab. MVM Films released the series in the United Kingdom.

An anime adaptation of the Girlish Number Shura manga was announced in April 2017, but TBS and Diomedéa announced the cancellation of the project in November 2018.

No.	Title (Note: All English episode titles are taken from Crunchyroll.)	Original release date
1	"Careless Chitose and This Rotten Business"; Transliteration: "Yasagure Chitose to Kusatta Gyōkai" (Japanese: やさぐれ千歳と腐った業界)	October 7, 2016
2	"Chitose the Braggart and the Voiceless Scream"; Transliteration: "Tengu na Chitose to Koe Naki Himei" (Japanese: 天狗な千歳と声なき悲鳴)	October 14, 2016
3	"Blasphemous Chitose and the Usual Story"; Transliteration: "Jadōna chitose to Ōdō Tenkai" (Japanese: 邪道な千歳と王道展開)	October 21, 2016
4	"High-Spirited Chitose and Her Merry Friends"; Transliteration: "Ikeike Chitose to Yukai na Nakamatachi" (Japanese: イケイケ千歳とゆかいな仲間たち)	October 28, 2016
5	"Cocky Chitose and Shattered Popularity"; Transliteration: "Choketta Chitose to Bokoboko Hyōka" (Japanese: ちょけった千歳とぼこぼこ評価)	November 4, 2016
6	"Chitose on the Beach and the Budget That Won't Go Through"; Transliteration: "Hamabe no Chitose to Tōranu Yosan" (Japanese: 浜辺の千歳と通らぬ予算)	November 11, 2016
7	"Curious Chitose and Parents' Day"; Transliteration: "Yajiuma Chitose to Jugyō Sankan" (Japanese: やじうま千歳と授業参観)	November 18, 2016
8	"Oversleeping Chitose and a Steamy Travel Mood"; Transliteration: "Nebosuke Chitose to Yukemuri Ryojō!" (Japanese: ねぼすけ千歳と湯煙旅情！)	November 25, 2016
9	"Uneasy Chitose and the Scampering Rookie"; Transliteration: "Shōsō Chitose to Shissō Rūkī" (Japanese: 焦燥千歳と疾走ルーキー)	December 2, 2016
10	"Chitose Falls Into Darkness and Disappointed Kuzu"; Transliteration: "Yami Ochi Chitose to Shitsui no Kuzu" (Japanese: 闇堕ち千歳と失意のクズ)	December 9, 2016
11	"Wavering Chitose and Determined Gojo"; Transliteration: "Yureru Chitose to Ketsui no Gojō" (Japanese: 揺れる千歳と決意の悟浄)	December 16, 2016
12	"Chitose Karasuma and..." Transliteration: "Karasuma Chitose to..." (Japanese: 烏丸千歳と...)	December 23, 2016
