= My Teen Romantic Comedy SNAFU Too! =

- Season 2
- Cover of the first Blu-ray volume released by Marvelous! in Japan on June 24, 2015, featuring Yukino Yukinoshita
- No. of episodes: 13

Release
- Original network: TBS
- Original release: April 3 – June 26, 2015

Season chronology
- ← Previous; OreGairu Next → OreGairu Climax

My Teen Romantic Comedy SNAFU Too! (Japanese: やはり俺の青春ラブコメはまちがっている。続, Hepburn: Yahari Ore no Seishun Rabukome wa Machigatteiru Zoku) is a 2015 comedy, slice of life Japanese anime series based on Wataru Watari's light novel series My Youth Romantic Comedy Is Wrong, as I Expected. It is the sequel to the first season which aired in 2013. The students of Soubu High School prepare to go back to their normal lives after the atmosphere of the cultural festival is subsided. Hachiman Hikigaya, Yukino Yukinoshita, and Yui Yuigahama continue with their responsibility of assisting their fellow peers in the Service Club and soon learn that the Fall season brings with it new social dynamics in the lives of the Soubu teenagers.

The season is produced by animation studio Feel and directed by Kei Oikawa, with series composition by Shōtarō Suga, character designs by Yuichi Tanaka, music by Monaca, and sound direction by Satoshi Motoyama. The thirteen-episode season sired on April 3, 2015, and ran until June 26, 2015, on TBS, with later airings on MBS, CBC, TUT, and BS-TBS. The season was acquired by Crunchyroll for online simulcast streaming in North America and other select parts of the world. This was followed by an acquisition by AnimeLab for an online simulcast in Australia and New Zealand. The season was licensed by Sentai Filmworks for distribution via select digital outlets and a home media release in North America.

The season uses six pieces of theme music: one opening theme, three ending themes, and two insert songs. The main opening theme is "Harumodoki" (春擬き,, Pseudo-Spring) by Nagi Yanagi. The main ending theme is "Everyday World. (エブリデイワールド)" by Yukino Yukinoshita (Saori Hayami) and Yui Yuigahama (Nao Tōyama). The ending theme of the fourth episode is "Everyday World -Ballade Arrange-Yui Solo Ver. (エブリデイワールド -Ballade Arrange-Yui Solo Ver.)" by Yuigahama (Tōyama), which also doubled as the insert song of the thirteenth episode. The ending theme of the seventh episode is "Everyday World -Ballade Arrange-Yukino Solo Ver. (エブリデイワールド -Ballade Arrange-Yukino Solo Ver.)" by Yukinoshita (Hayami). "Bitter Bitter Sweet" is used as the insert song for the first episode and also performed by Yukinoshita (Hayami) and Yuigahama (Tōyama). "Yukitoki" (ユキトキ) by Yanagi is used as the insert song for the tenth episode.

== Episodes ==
Story	Episode	Title (Note: All English titles are taken from Sentai Filmworks.)	Directed by	Written by	Original release date (Note: My Teen Romantic Comedy SNAFU Too! was advertised as premiering in TBS's Thursday 25:51 (1:51 a.m. JST) time slot, so all episodes effectively aired the next calendar day.)	Ref.
14	1	"Nobody Knows Why They Came to the Service Club."; Transliteration: "Naze Karera ga Hōshi bu ni kita no ka Daremoshiranai." (Japanese: 何故、彼らが奉仕部に来たのか誰も知らない。)	Shuhei Matsushita	Shōtarō Suga	April 3, 2015	
The lively atmosphere of Soubu High School begins dissipating after the events of the recent festivals and the focus shifts to an upcoming field-trip to Kyoto. While the Service Club discuss the trip, they are rudely interrupted by Hayato Hayama and Kakeru Tobe, who request that they help the latter in a romantic pursuit of Hina Ebina. Hachiman Hikigaya decides to accept the request and outlines the risks of inviting a girl, before they try to discern Kakeru's favorable traits. The next day, Yui Yuigahama outlines a plan to utilize the field-trip for the request until Hina interrupts them. Hina remarks about the evolving relationships of her peer group and further adds her support for Hachiman to become more sociable. Eventually, the Soubu High students arrive in Kyoto, and Hachiman and Yui make little progress in assisting Kakeru with Hina. Afterwards, Hachiman gives Yukino Yukinoshita a progress report on the request. However, when they spot Shizuka Hiratsuka attempting to sneak out of the hotel, the latter convinces them to keep her nightly escapade under wraps and sends them off with some words of reassurance. Eventually, the first day of the field-trip ends with Hachiman escorting Yukino back to the hotel.
15	2	"His and Her Confessions Won't Reach Anyone."; Transliteration: "Kare to Kanojo no Kokuhaku wa Darenimo Todokanai." (Japanese: 彼と彼女の告白は誰にも届かない。)	Satoshi Saga	Shōtarō Suga	April 10, 2015	
On the second day of the Kyoto trip, Hachiman runs into Yumiko Miura at a convenience store and learns that Hina had rejected every one of her romantic suitors, with Yumiko voicing her content in the current status of their peer group. The Soubu students arrive in Arashiyama the next day and Hayato uncharacteristically confides in Hachiman about his myopic fears on the consequences that Kakeru's confession will have on the integrity of their peer group. Hayato then reluctantly tasks Hachiman with saving it. As the Soubu students quietly observe Kakeru's confession to Hina later that night, Hachiman once again risks his reputation by interrupting them and faking a confession to Hina. Hina rejects him and explains her desire to be single for the time being before running off. Kakeru then thanks Hachiman for saving him from the embarrassment of rejection before leaving with Hayato and the others. Despite Hachiman saving a peer group from imploding, Yukino voices her disgust at his choice of action and Yui tearfully yells at him for failing to see how his unorthodox problem solving methods hurt those who care about him. The next day, Hina thanks Hachiman for fulfilling her request in saving the status quo of her peer group.
16	3	"Silently, Yukinoshita Yukino Makes Her Decision."; Transliteration: "Shizuka ni, Yukinoshita Yukino wa Ketsui Suru." (Japanese: 静かに、雪ノ下雪乃は決意する。)	Takashi Naotani	Keiichirō Ōchi	April 17, 2015	
School resumes and the students of 2F ignore the events of the field-trip and continue their normal interactions in contrast to the stark tension between Hachiman and Yukino in the Service Club. Meguri Shiromeguri and Iroha Isshiki interrupt the club and request their aid in helping the latter lose the upcoming Student Council president election, since she was nominated against her will in a prank. Hachiman then proposes an idea that would solve the request via censure motion against Iroha. This method only serves to infuriate Yukino and her perspective once again clashes with the lateral thinking of Hachiman. Afterwards, Yukino has Shizuka determine the status of the club contest and Shizuka also reminds Hachiman of the dangers of his methods. Much to his dismay, after school, Hachiman runs into Haruno Yukinoshita along with his middle school acquaintances Kaori Orimoto and Chika Nakamachi. At the next Service Club meeting, Hachiman chastises Yukino for developing a plan that fails to account for future complications should Iroha get elected and argues that his plan bypasses the extra effort to solve said complications. Yukino then reproaches Hachiman for his methods, which prompts him to walk out on the club meeting. Later on, Iroha goes after Hachiman and expresses her concern over the state of the Service Club, but he promises that they will figure something out.
17	4	"And Yuigahama Yui Makes Her Declaration."; Transliteration: "Soshite, Yuigahama Yui wa Sengen Suru." (Japanese: そして、由比ヶ浜結衣は宣言する。)	Yousuke Hashiguchi	Keiichirō Ōchi	April 24, 2015	
Hayato invites Hachiman to hang out with Kaori, Chika and himself one weekend but Hachiman unsurprisingly declines, only to reconsider after pressuring from Haruno. The four of them eventually go out one afternoon and the Kaihin girls continuously poke fun at the expense of Hachiman. The evening eventually builds to a climax at a local café when Hayato sharply defends Hachiman's integrity from the girls. Afterwards, Yukino voices her disapproval for being tricked by Hayato into aiding his point to the girls instead of discussing the election and Haruno only adds fuel to the fire after observing the entire episode. In the aftermath, Hayato apologizes for creating an uncomfortable situation since he had only intended to get Hachiman to see the error of his self-sacrificial methods. This offends Hachiman to the point where he argues that the consequences of his choices are his alone and should not be the concern of others. The next day, Yukino decides to enter the election against Iroha as a solution for her request. Since this effectively jeopardizes the future of the Service Club should Yukino emerge victorious, Yui also decides to enter the election in an attempt to preserve the Service Club should she win. However, the choices of his club members leave Hachiman with a feeling of uneasiness.
18	5	"The Scent of Tea No Longer Fills That Room."; Transliteration: "Sono heya ni wa, Kōcha no Kaori wa mō shi nai." (Japanese: その部屋には、紅茶の香りはもうしない。)	Yuuyuki Yanase	Keiichirō Ōchi	May 1, 2015	
Hachiman decides to confide in his sister Komachi about the recent events and she gives him some words of encouragement, before requesting that he will find a way to keep both Yukino and Yui in the Service Club. The next day, Hachiman meets Yoshiteru Zaimokuza, Saika Totsuka, Saki Kawasaki, and Komachi to brainstorm ideas for handling the student council election. They help Hachiman realize that his initial censure motion proposal was wrong since it would have damaged the only thing that Iroha cares about, her self-image. Hachiman then has Saki draw up a list of potential candidates and further has Yoshiteru use the names to create an anonymous social media campaign. The next day, Hachiman manages to convince Iroha into accepting the presidential position by using a combination of the social media statistics and clever reverse psychology to highlight its perks. Hachiman later presents the statistics to Yui and Yukino but does not tell them about how he falsely mined the data, using it only as a means to convince the pair that they need not run anymore since Iroha would win. Yui thanks Hachiman with a small understanding for his method. Iroha eventually wins the election by default due to having no competition as it originally was and life moves on once again.
19	6	"Without Incident, The Congress Dances, But Does Not Progress."; Transliteration: "Tsutsuganaku, Kaigi wa Odori, Saredo Susuma zu." (Japanese: つつがなく、会議は踊り、されど進まず。)	Masayuki Matsumoto	Shōtarō Suga	May 8, 2015	
The Service Club tries harder to maintain their usual atmosphere after the recent events. This causes Hachiman to try to maintain this charade with his fellow club members by becoming more sociable with them after observing Hayato's peer group. Iroha eventually interrupts the club and asks them to help the Student Council plan a joint Christmas event with Kaihin General. When Yukino grows tense however, Hachiman decides to reject the request on behalf of the club and instead takes it on as a personal favor to Iroha in order to maintain the facade of normalcy with Yukino. Later that day, Hachiman meets with the Soubu and Kaihin Student Councils at the local community center to begin planning the event. While Hachiman has difficulty following the jargon of the Kaihin brainstorms, Iroha unwaveringly accepts their thoughts based on nothing more than their official presentation, much to the dismay of her fellow Soubu members. The next day, Hachiman tries communicating an idea in the Kaihin gibberish, but it backfires and gets doubly misinterpreted in the organizational noise. Making no progress at the end of the day, Kaori catches up with Hachiman and mockingly laughs at him when she learns of his membership to the Service Club.
20	7	"However, That Room Continues to Portray An Endless Everyday Scene."; Transliteration: "Saredo, Sono Heya wa Owara nu Nichijō o Enjitsuzukeru." (Japanese: されど、その部屋は終わらぬ日常を演じ続ける。)	Takashi Naotani	Shōtarō Suga	May 15, 2015	
Yui laments on the state of the Service Club one afternoon before Hachiman later goes looking for Iroha when she fails to arrive at the Kaihin-Soubu meeting. This lands him in an involuntary discussion with Hayato about their reactions to helping others. Iroha later arrives and they discover that Tamanawa had outsourced some of the work to grade-schoolers. Hachiman tries to get Tamanawa to begin weighing and eliminating possible ideas but he explains that everyone should have an idea somehow baked into the Christmas event. An unexpected encounter with Saika later makes Hachiman question his preconceived ideal for helping others. At the next meeting, Hachiman realizes that he had been made the virtual head of the Soubu council. This prompts him to once again try to get Tamanawa to narrow the ideas so that Iroha can have a better understanding of what to do. Hachiman assists Rumi Tsurumi with finishing the decorations and ponders on how his previous methods have affected others. Hachiman later runs into Yukino and while knowing that he had been assisting Iroha with her request, she explains that he does not have to simultaneously look out for herself and Yui and offers a leave of absence from club activities to relieve him of that burden.
21	8	"Even So, Hikigaya Hachiman."; Transliteration: "Soredemo, Hikigaya Hachiman wa." (Japanese: それでも、比企谷八幡は。)	Mitsuhiro Iwasaki	Keiichirō Ōchi	May 22, 2015	
Shizuka spots Hachiman about to return home from his chance encounter with Yukino and he outlines the desperate state of recent events. Shizuka gets right to his root emotional problem by explaining that his attempts to protect Yukino and Yui had in fact been the very cause of the rift within the Service Club. She suggests that he contemplate his feelings until he figures out exactly what he had been trying to achieve. The next day, Hachiman takes Shizuka's advice and asks for Yui and Yukino's assistance after admitting the mess his plans had created. Yukino declines per her usual defensive trait and Yui tearfully highlights her unfairness to open up, but Yukino retorts by chastising Yui for hiding her true feelings as well. Hachiman comes to the realization about what Shizuka had meant by not simply voicing one's feelings and fights back tears when he reveals that he truly wishes to understand the feelings of those around him. Hachiman's unfamiliar presentation then causes a conflict with Yukino's inability to discern a person's true emotional state which literally scares her off to the roof. Hachiman and Yui go after her and Yui's mutual sentiment for them to be more open with each other resonates with Yukino so much that she decides to help Hachiman.
22	9	"And So, Yukinoshita Yukino."; Transliteration: "Soshite, Yukinoshita Yukino wa." (Japanese: そして、雪ノ下雪乃は。)	Tomoya Takahashi	Keiichirō Ōchi	May 29, 2015	
Hachiman fills Yukino and Yui in with the details of the next Kaihin-Soubu meeting before attending with Iroha. This allows Yukino to witness first hand the disastrous state of the Christmas event preparations and the four decide to seek further guidance from Shizuka. Shizuka decides to encourage brainstorming ideas with tickets for a Christmas-themed event at the Destiny Land amusement park, and Yui brings along Hayato, Yumiko, Hina, and Kakeru for the outing. The group starts out the event by taking some pictures immediately followed by a space-themed ride and a panda bear-themed ride where Hachiman observes Iroha's attempts to flirt with Hayato. The Service Club then takes a break at a gift shop to pick out presents for Komachi and Yui takes the opportunity to poke at her feelings for Hachiman. Hachiman and Yukino get separated from the others on their way to another ride, and Yukino opens up more to him about her relationship with Haruno. She explains that she would often think about the good traits that Haruno possesses and why she does not and further extends this train of thought to include Hachiman. They eventually meet up with the others for the fireworks show and with everyone distracted, Hachiman notices Iroha and Hayato after which the former runs away in tears.
23	10	"What the Lights In Each of Their Hands Illuminate."; Transliteration: "Sorezore no, Tenohira no Naka no Akari ga Terasu mono wa." (Japanese: それぞれの、掌の中の灯が照らすものは。)	Shuhei Matsushita	Shōtarō Suga	June 5, 2015	
Iroha forces Hachiman to take her home after her rejection by Hayato and reveals that his recent outburst in the Service Club had prompted her to act prematurely. Hachiman has the Student Council meet with the Service Club some time later and proposes that they adamantly push for a drastic change in the Kaihin-Soubu meeting to prevent a disaster in the Christmas event. The Soubu students then try this tactic at the next meeting and when Tamanawa shoots them down, Hachiman calls them out on their fear of responsibility coupled with their inability to perform under said responsibility as further proposed by Yukino. This has the desired effect and they soon settle on a musical rendition and stage play. Finally on the day of the Christmas event, Iroha takes charge and the event turns out a huge success. The Service Club go out to celebrate the New Year a week later and Hachiman gives Yukino some advice to spend the season with her family. Hachiman and Yui go shopping for Yukino's birthday the next day and run into Haruno and Hayato while waiting on their parents. Haruno calls Yukino over from home, much to her annoyance. Her strained familial ties are expressed when her mother arrives.
24	11	"Each and Every Time, Hayama Hayato Lives Up to Expectations."; Transliteration: "Itsudemo, Hayama Hayato wa Kitai ni Kotae te iru." (Japanese: いつでも、葉山隼人は期待に応えている。)	Mitsuhiro Iwasaki	Keiichirō Ōchi	June 12, 2015	
The senior students begin thinking about specializing their fields of study towards Liberal Arts during the new semester but quickly focus their attention on a rumor about relations between Yukino and Hayato. This prompts Yumiko to visit the Service Club where she tearfully exposes a fear of growing apart from Hayato since he had chosen not to share his future plans with their peer group. Hachiman fails to confront Hayato about his choice and indirectly from Haruno when she shows up at Soubu High to assist the Student Council. Hachiman decides to use the Annual Winter Event Marathon Race to his advantage by using the stress of the event to goad Hayato into choosing Sciences. This unexpectedly causes Hayato's inferiority complex towards Hachiman to surface and he decides to do the opposite of the latter's words. Hayato eventually wins the marathon and dispels the rumor when he thanks Yumiko and Iroha for their support. As Yukino binds Hachiman's scrapes they share a moment of romantic tension, stealthily witnessed by Yui. Hayato apologizes to Yukino for the rumor at the after-party. Hayato eventually tells Hachiman that he did not want to reveal his choice since the status quo of his peer group would have taken it entirely out of his hands and hence hurt his pride in deciding for himself.
25	12	"With the Answer He Seeks Still Out of Reach, The Real Thing He Craves Keeps Going Wrong."; Transliteration: "Imada, Kare no Motomeru Kotae ni wa te ga Todoka zu, Honmono wa Machigaitsuzukeru." (Japanese: 未だ、彼の求める答えには手が届かず、本物はまちがい続ける。)	Takashi Naotani	Keiichirō Ōchi	June 19, 2015	
Hachiman meets with Haruno one day after being called out and learns that the Yukino that they have all come to know may just be a persona she invented. The Soubu students turn their attention towards Valentine's Day and the excitement causes Hina and Saki to seek help with making homemade chocolates from the Service Club along with Iroha and Yumiko, who intend to give theirs to Hayato. Since Hayato had decided not to accept chocolates from anyone, Hachiman concludes that they would need an excuse to force him to accept them. This prompts Iroha enlist the Student Council in throwing a joint Cooking Class event with Kaihin General. The event turns out to be a huge success in bringing everyone together and Shizuka expresses her content with the growth that Hachiman has made as an individual since expanding his social circle. Yukino and Yui later present Hachiman with their chocolates but Haruno shatters their moment together claiming it to be a facade. As the three walk home later that night, they suddenly encounter Yukino's mother and Yui and Hachiman get a glimpse at Yukino's struggle for individuality in her family's shadow. This leaves Hachiman with the impression that they all have yet to find their true selves hidden behind their personas.
26	13	"Spring Always Comes to Life Buried Underneath a Pile of Snow."; Transliteration: "Haru wa, Furitsumoru Yukinoshita nite Yuware, Mebukihajimeru." (Japanese: 春は、降り積もる雪の下にて結われ、芽吹き始める。)	Takashi Ikebata, Koji Kobayashi & Kei Oikawa	Keiichirō Ōchi	June 26, 2015	
Haruno intercepts the Service Club on their way home one afternoon and lambastes Yukino for failing to make life choices on her own despite the immense freedom the Yukinoshita family has allowed her. Yui then allows Yukino to spend the night at the Yuigahama residence until things between the Yukinoshita sisters cool down. While Komachi heads out to her Soubu Entrance Examinations the next day, Yui invites Hachiman and Yukino out to the Kasai Rinkai Park where they spend the day at the aquarium and bond over their respective personalities while observing the various aquatic life. The three then share a reaction to the bonds of a pair of penguins and Yukino makes an allusion to her strained sense of belonging. Yui eventually states the true reason she called them out and as the day draws to a close, she uses her initial Service Club request to claim responsibility for the fractured bonds between them and further requests that they continue feigning their blissful status quo. However, Hachiman interjects that it would be better to suffer in their uncertainty rather than live in a deception, and the girls decide to accept his compromise. Yukino then decides to address Hachiman's request for them to understand each other and finally confides her own request to the Service Club.

== Home media ==
Marvelous! began releasing the series in Japan on seven Blu-ray and DVD volumes between June 24, 2015, and April 28, 2016. Limited Edition Blu-ray volumes included bonus light novels of the series.

Marvelous! (Region 2 - Japan)
Vol.	Episodes	Blu-ray / DVD artwork	Notable bonus material	Release date	Ref.
1	1	Yukino Yukinoshita	Original Soundtrack / Light Novel (a)	June 24, 2015	
2	2, 3	Yui Yuigahama	Light Novel (n)	July 23, 2015	
3	4, 5	Iroha Isshiki	Light Novel (o)	August 26, 2015	
4	6, 7	Komachi Hikigaya	Light novel (t)	September 18, 2015	
5	8, 9	Shizuka Hiratsuka	Light novel (h)	October 23, 2015	
6	10, 11	Haruno Yukinoshita	Light novel (e)	November 26, 2015	
7	12, 13	Yui Yuigahama & Yukino Yukinoshita	Light novel (r)	April 28, 2016	
