= My Teen Romantic Comedy SNAFU season 1 =

My Teen Romantic Comedy SNAFU
- Season 1
- Cover of the Blu-ray box set released by NBCUniversal Entertainment Japan in Japan on March 4, 2015, featuring Hachiman Hikigaya (left) and Yukino Yukinoshita (right)
- No. of episodes: 13

Release
- Original network: TBS
- Original release: April 5 – June 28, 2013

Season chronology
- Next → OreGairu Too!

My Teen Romantic Comedy SNAFU is a comedy, slice of life, drama Japanese anime series based on Wataru Watari's light novel series My Youth Romantic Comedy Is Wrong, as I Expected. Soubu High School is filled with many different types of teenagers all wanting to fit in. Despite preferring to be a loner, Hachiman Hikigaya is forced to join fellow loner, Yukino Yukinoshita and classmate, Yui Yuigahama in forming the Soubu High School Service Club. Also being linked by a car accident in the past, these three offer help to their fellow adolescents in dealing with the struggles and complicated psychology of being a teenager.

The first season is produced by animation studio Brain's Base and directed by Ai Yoshimura, with series composition by Shōtarō Suga, character design by Yū Shindō, art direction by Shigemi Ikeda, music by Monaca, and sound direction by Satoshi Motoyama. The series aired on April 5, 2013, on TBS, with later airings on MBS, CBC, and BS-TBS. The twelve-episode season was followed by an extra thirteenth episode which aired on June 28, 2013, and an OVA episode on September 19, 2013, both of which were written by Watari. The season was picked up by Crunchyroll for online simulcast streaming in North America and other select parts of the world. The Anime Network and Anime on Demand also obtained the series for streaming. NBCUniversal Entertainment Japan released the season in Japan on seven Blu-ray and DVD volumes between June 26 and December 25, 2013. The season was licensed by Sentai Filmworks for distribution via select digital outlets and a home media release in North America. Madman Entertainment later acquired the rights to an Australian release.

The season use five pieces of theme music: one opening theme, three closing themes and one insert song. The opening theme is "Yukitoki" (ユキトキ) by Nagi Yanagi and the main ending theme is "Hello Alone" by Yukino Yokinoshita (Saori Hayami) and Yui Yuigahama (Nao Tōyama). "Hello Alone -Yui Ballade-" by Yui Yuigahama (Nao Tōyama) is used as the ending theme of the fifth episode. The ending theme of the thirteenth episode (extra episode) is "Hello Alone -Band Arrange-" by Yukino Yokinoshita (Saori Hayami) and Yui Yuigahama (Nao Tōyama). "Bitter Bitter Sweet" performed by Yukino Yukinoshita (Saori Hayami) and Yui Yuigahama (Nao Tōyama) is used as the insert song of the twelfth episode.

== Episodes ==
Story	Episode	Title (Note: All English titles are taken from Sentai Filmworks.)	Directed by	Written by	Original release date (Note: My Teen Romantic Comedy SNAFU was advertised as premiering primarily in TBS's Thursday 25:29 (1:29 am JST) time slot, so all episodes effectively aired the next calendar day.)	Ref.
1	1	"Youth Romantic Comedy Is Wrong, as I Expected"; Transliteration: "Kōshite Karera no Machigatta Seishun ga Hajimaru." (Japanese: こうして彼らのまちがった青春が始まる。)	Ai Yoshimura	Douko Machida	April 5, 2013	
Pragmatic loner Hachiman Hikigaya writes an essay describing his view on the lives of contemporary teenagers which displeases his language teacher, Shizuka Hiratsuka. As punishment, she forces Hachiman to join the Soubu High School Service Club and requests that its sole member—Yukino Yukinoshita—try to remedy his broken social skills. This immediately results in a clash between both students and Shizuka proposes that they contest their ideals by helping people sent to the club. The next day, Hachiman learns that Yukino was paradoxically made an outcast because of her beauty and relates to her differential way of thinking. Afterwards, Yui Yuigahama requests that the Service Club help her bake cookies for a friend and Yukino fails teaching her the basics of cooking. Hachiman tries an alternative approach and uses psychology to get Yui to realize that the sheer act of doing something for another person means more than how the act turns out. The next week, Yukino and Hachiman discuss Yui's request with respect to the ultimate goal of personal improvement, versus the rewards of working towards said improvement despite risking failure in doing so. Afterwards, Yui shows up at the club and thanks both Hachiman and Yukino with homemade cookies she made herself.
2	2	"I'm Sure Everyone Bears A Worry of Equal Weight"; Transliteration: "Kitto, Dareshimo Hitoshi Nami ni Nayami o Kakaeteiru." (Japanese: きっと、誰しも等し並みに悩みを抱えている。)	Koji Aritomi	Douko Machida	April 12, 2013	
Shizuka once again reproves Hachiman for basing his Biology report on his dissatisfaction with the dominance hierarchy established by social groups. Later that day, Yumiko Miura pressures Yui for a straight excuse when she tries to break away from their social group to have lunch with Yukino. Yukino then shows up and demands an explanation for Yui's tardiness but ends up forgiving her. However Yumiko makes an outburst when Yui focuses her attention on Yukino, prompting the latter to call Yumiko out on her self-centeredness. The tense atmosphere then drives the other students out and Yui uses the opportunity to explain that meeting Hachiman and Yukino helped her realize that she can be her own person and not force herself to do what others want from her, which Yumiko accepts. The following afternoon, a delusional teen named Yoshiteru Zaimokuza shows up at the Service Club. After the group beats around the bush to dissect his ostentatious personality, Yoshiteru asks that they help review a light novel he wrote. Hachiman and Yukino spend the night reading his novel and present their critiques the next day which turn out less than positive. Despite the Service Club's brutal honesty, Yoshiteru sincerely accepts their words and promises to have them review his next literary work.
3	3	"Sometimes the God of Rom-Coms Smiles Upon You"; Transliteration: "Tamani Rabu Kome no Kami-sama wa ī Koto o Suru." (Japanese: たまにラブコメの神様はいいことをする。)	Kaoruhisa Iida	Douko Machida	April 19, 2013	
Yui interrupts Hachiman while having lunch outside at his favorite spot and excitedly tells him about her growing relationship with Yukino. During the following gym class, Saika Totsuka practices tennis with Hachiman and eventually asks him to join the tennis club. Hachiman then asks Yukino for her opinion on the offer during the next Service Club meeting. However, Saika arrives and requests that they help him practice tennis for the next few days. While the group practices one lunchtime, Yumiko and her group demand to use the tennis court and ignore the fact that Saika has permission to use it. However, Hayato Hayama proposes that they have a doubles match with the winner gaining access to the court. The match begins with Hachiman and Yui against Hayato and Yumiko, but Yui sprains her ankle and switches with Yukino. After a bit of pregame banter with Yumiko, Yukino dominates the match until her stamina runs out and entrusts the game to Hachiman. Hachiman makes his last two serves by using his knowledge of the sea breezes and hitting the ball in a high arc, which wins the game. The spectators end up ignoring the Service Club's victory when Hayato saves Yumiko from injuring herself from the final serve.
4	4	"Basically, He Has Few Friends"; Transliteration: "Tsumari, Kare wa Tomodachi ga Sukunai." (Japanese: つまり、彼は友達が少ない。)	Hideya Takahashi	Shōtarō Suga	April 26, 2013	
While on their way to school, Hachiman and his sister Komachi, discuss the car accident he was involved in on what was supposed to be his first day of high school. Afterward, Shizuka reprimands Hachiman for his choice of future occupation and reminds him about picking a three-person group for the upcoming workplace field-trip. Later the Service Club receives a mysterious shared text message. Hayato requests that the Service Club will stop sending messages which paints his clique members Kakeru, Yamato, and Oka as delinquents. The Service Club links the message to the field-trip and deduce that one of the three plans to eliminate another so they can form a group with Hayato. Hachiman and Yui then take turns gathering information, but Yui ends up failing miserably due to her inability to remain subtle. Afterward, Hachiman begins observing Hayato's clique until Saika interrupts him. However, he solves the mystery when Hayato joins their conversation. Hachiman later explains the cohesive relationship between Kakeru, Yamato, and Oka, and has Hayato take himself out of their group to give them a chance to bond. Hayato then thanks Hachiman by grouping with him and Saika for the field-trip.
5	5	"And Again, He Returns from Whence He Came"; Transliteration: "Mata Shite mo, Kare wa Moto Kita Michi e Hikikaesu." (Japanese: またしても、彼は元来た道へ引き返す。)	Noriyuki Noi	Douko Machida	May 3, 2013	
Shizuka scolds Hachiman for arriving at the very end of after-school classes. He makes his way to a local cafe, and runs into Yui, Yukino, and Saika, and they are joined by Komachi and her friend Taishi Kawasaki. Taishi explains his concern over the late-night excursions of his sister Saki Kawasaki and the Service Club resolve to get to the bottom of the matter. The next day, the club employ various schemes of approaching Saki which all end up in failure. With Komachi's help however, the Service Club learn that Saki works nights at a cafe and eventually track her down to a bar at the top of a high-class hotel in Chiba. The Service Club then makes an exit after tensions flare between Saki and Yukino when they discover that the former had tricked the hotel management about her age to obtain employment. Saki meets with the group the next day and they learn that she had been saving up for college. However, Komachi points out that she should not have made Taishi worry and Hachiman proposes that she apply for a scholarship instead. Afterwards Komachi shocks Hachiman with the revelation that Yui was the owner of the dog he had saved in the car accident. Believing that Yui was only friendly to him out of guilt, Hachiman ends their acquaintanceship during the field-trip.
6	6	"Finally, His and Her Beginning Have Ended"; Transliteration: "Yōyaku Kare to Kanojo no Hajimari ga Owaru." (Japanese: ようやく彼と彼女の始まりが終わる。)	Tomoyuki Kurokawa	Shōtarō Suga	May 10, 2013	
Yui stops coming to the Service Club meetings and seems to drop out altogether after the previous encounter with Hachiman and Shizuka tasks them in recruiting a new third member. Yukino proposes that she would like Yui to rejoin the club by celebrating her birthday. Later that weekend, they visit the mall to present shop for Yui, with little luck. The pair eventually settle on purchasing some trendy accessories for Yui, until they meet Yukino's older sister Haruno, who playfully teases them with her transparent persona. Much to their surprise, Yui also runs into the pair and Yukino invites her to the next Service Club meeting. At the next meeting, Yukino explains to Yui that they intended to celebrate her birthday and thank her for all the things she did for the club. Hachiman also uses the opportunity to clear the air with Yui and explains that she does not owe him anything and hence, should not pity him. Yui argues that she never thought of herself as pitying him but the complexity of the situation leaves her at a loss for words. However, Yukino helps repair the rift between them by sincerely explaining they should drop their current situation and begin a new path, which they decide to take.
7	7	"Regardless, Not Getting a Break over Summer Break is Wrong"; Transliteration: "Tomoare, Natsuyasuminanoni Yasumenai no wa Nanikaokashī." (Japanese: ともあれ、夏休みなのに休めないのは何かおかしい。)	Tomoyuki Kawamura	Katsuhiko Takayama	May 17, 2013	
Hachiman tries his best to relax during Summer break and ignores the backlog of messages from Shizuka concerning the Service Club activities. Shizuka eventually manages to lure Hachiman out and takes the Service Club and other Soubu High students to a prefectural park in Chiba to oversee an elementary school Summer camp for a few days. During the orienteering event, Hachiman and Yukino bear witness to the deliberate shunning of the young Rumi Tsurumi by her peers, and the many failed attempts by Hayato to remedy the situation. Rumi senses a similar aura from Hachiman and Yukino, and confides her problem to them, with Yukino adding that it would only snowball once she gets into middle school with the same people. The Soubu group later try to come up with ways to help Rumi that evening. However, tensions flare when Yukino shoots down an idea by Yumiko based on her general lack of experience in interactions with people like Rumi. Unable to sleep that night, Hachiman finds Yukino in the woods, and she explains her desire to help Rumi as she sees a reflection of Yui in her, and also a bit of the history that exists between herself and Hayato before going to bed. The awakened Rumi sits by a stream under the starlight.
8	8	"One Day, They Shall Learn the Truth"; Transliteration: "Izure Karera Kanojora wa Shinjitsu o Shiru." (Japanese: いずれ彼ら彼女らは真実を知る。)	Hideaki Nakano	Katsuhiko Takayama	May 24, 2013	
The Summer camp continues and Shizuka asks the Soubu group to prepare a 'test of courage' and bonfire event for the evening. After some preparations, the Soubu girls relax at a nearby river and Rumi joins Hachiman on the bank where he outlines the waning probability of holding on to elementary school ties as one grows older. However, Rumi explains that she had already given up on making friends based on reciprocating her current treatment to her peers in the past. In order to assist Rumi, Hachiman proposes that the Soubu group create a source of conflict within the peer group, shunning Rumi. This would reveal their true self-allegiance and ultimately shatter the ties between them, thus moving the focus away from Rumi. The plan then seems to work when they implement it during the 'test of courage', until Rumi saves the girls in a dramatic turn of events. Afterwards during the bonfire event, the Soubu group notes that Hachiman's unorthodox plan had set the stage for the girls to split apart after betraying each other and hence slightly improve Rumi's situation. The camp then ends the next day and when Haruno comes to pick Yukino up, Yui and Hachiman recognise the Yukinoshita limousine as the one that struck Hachiman in the accident.
9	9	"And Yet Again, He Returns from Whence He Came."; Transliteration: "Sando, Kare wa Moto Kita Michi e Hikikaesu." (Japanese: 三度、彼は元来た道へ引き返す。)	Hideya Takahashi	Shōtarō Suga	May 31, 2013	
Yui invites Hachiman and Komachi to the annual summer fireworks festival as thanks for taking care of her dog but Komachi backs out of the offer to give Hachiman and Yui a chance to go together. On the day of the festival, Hachiman and Yui try to compensate for the awkwardness of going out together for the first time by shopping around for some items for Komachi. The fireworks soon begin and the pair run into Haruno while looking for a place to watch the spectacle. Haruno uses the opportunity to explain a little of the complicated relationship between herself and Yukino and laments that Yukino has difficulty in forming meaningful relationships with people. At the end of the festival, Haruno mistakenly refers to Yukino's involvement in the accident but Hachiman brushes it off as water under the bridge. Afterwards, Hachiman takes Yui home and she explains that she would rather Hachiman, Yukino, and herself not keep their feelings bottled away and further laments that she would have befriended Hachiman even without the accident, which he rejects based on his own causal reasoning. However as school resumes the following week, Hachiman begins hating himself for believing that Yukino was incapable of lying since she had said she did not know who he was in the first episode.
10	10	"While They Remain As Distant As They Were, The Festival Shall Soon Encircle Us"; Transliteration: "Izentoshite Karera no Kyori wa Kawarazu ni, Matsuri wa Mōsugu Kānibaru." (Japanese: 依然として彼らの距離は変わらずに、祭りはもうすぐカーニバる。)	Risako Yoshida	Shōtarō Suga	June 7, 2013	
Shizuka volunteers Hachiman as the male representative of 2F for the cultural festival committee and Hayama later nominates Minami Sagami as the female representative, who further volunteers to be the committee chair in an attempt to further her self growth. Afterwards, Minami requests that Yukino assist her with the chairing responsibilities as vice-president. Much to everyone's surprise, Yukino excels at managing the festival responsibilities far more effectively than Minami. In the meantime, Hina Ebina takes charge of a stage production and Haruno tries to apply for a musical performance. Minami then suggests that the committee help enjoy preparing for the festival, with Yukino arguing that the logistical work takes priority. However more than half of the committee take Minami's advice and leave the remaining members in an up-hill battle with the growing paperwork. The next day, Yukino efficiently takes on most of the work but when Hayato criticises her for it, Hachiman moves the focus away from Yukino by blaming the deserting members. Afterwards, Minami passes most of her responsibilities to Yukino before going back to helping the other classes around the school. Overwhelmed with paperwork, Yukino takes most of it home and fails to show up at school the next day.
11	11	"And So, the Curtain on Each's Stage Rises, and The Festival Grows to a Feast on Us"; Transliteration: "Soshite, Sorezore no Butai no Maku ga Agari, Matsuri wa Saikō ni Fesutiba Tte Iru." (Japanese: そして、それぞれの舞台の幕が上がり、祭りは最高にフェスティバっている。)	Shunsuke Ishikawa	Katsuhiko Takayama	June 14, 2013	
Hachiman and Yui visit Yukino and find that she had worked herself to exhaustion by taking on most of the festival work. Yui scolds her for not relying on them more and Hachiman reinforces her argument by explaining that in an ideal world people rely on each other, but even then he does not know if it would be the right course of action. The next day, the festival committee attempt to brainstorm festival slogans which all indicate a sense of comradery. Hachiman cleverly proposes a slogan by using the Kanji for "People" (人, Hito) to highlight the unfair division of labor which Minami had introduced into the committee. This stunt grants Hachiman the contempt of the rest of the committee and they come out in droves the next day to falsify his words. The Soubu High School Cultural Festival begins some time later and Minami fumbles her opening speech due to stage fright. Despite this, the rest of the festival turns out to be a huge hit, especially Hina's yaoi stage production. Hachiman later takes a break and Yui joins him for lunch and explains that she had decided to wait for Yukino to open up to her and will also actively try to strengthen her bond with Hachiman. Elsewhere, Minami locks herself in the bathroom after being riddled with embarrassment.
12	12	"And So, His and Her and Her Youths Continue Being Wrong"; Transliteration: "Kōshite, Kare to Kanojo to Kanojo no Seishun wa Machigai Tsudzukeru." (Japanese: こうして、彼と彼女と彼女の青春はまちがい続ける。)	Ai Yoshimura	Shōtarō Suga	June 21, 2013	
Soubu High's Cultural Festival continues and Hachiman is stuck carrying out his duty as a committee member by documenting the day's events on film. Komachi shows up and is surprised to find her brother actually taking a bit of responsibility. As the festival enters its last stages, Haruno entertains the audience with a full orchestra performance. Soon enough, as the closing ceremony approaches, Meguri reports that Minami is missing in action. Since she is needed to deliver the closing speech, the group decides to stall for time while Hachiman searches the campus for her. Hachiman eventually finds Minami atop the laboratory roof and realizes she is sulking because Yukino stole the spotlight away from her, despite asking for her help. Hayato and Minami's clique show up to get her, although she refuses to budge. Seeing no other alternative, Hachiman craftily uses reverse psychology combined with Minami's true social reality to guilt her into accepting her duty, by using a tone which enrages Hayato. Afterwards, the festival ends as Yui, Yukino, Haruno, and Shizuka give their extra musical performance followed by Minami's closing speech. Everyone shows mixed reactions on Hachiman's course of action but Shizuka compliments him for always finding ways to rescue people from their problems, but laments that it breaks her heart since he always sacrifices himself to do so. That evening, at the Service Club room, Hachiman and Yukino discuss how far they came to know each other, with Yukino hinting that they became friends. Yui eventually shows up at the club to invite them for an after party hosted by Hayato to celebrate the festival's success. Hachiman ends by pondering that while there are no second chances in life, his and Yukino's ideals on society may continue to be seen as deviances.
13 (EX) (Note: Some international licensors such as Sentai Filmworks list this episode as the 13th, rather than its Japanese designation as an extra episode.)	13 (EX)	"And So, Their Festival Will Never End"; Transliteration: "Dakara, Karera no Matsuri wa Owaranai." (Japanese: だから、彼らの祭りは終わらない。)	Hideya Takahashi	Wataru Watari	June 28, 2013	
Soubu High School holds its annual athletic festival and Hachiman tries to rationalize his disinterest in participating by reinterpreting a speech by Pierre de Coubertin. Some time earlier, Meguri Shiromeguri requests that the Service Club assist her in planning her final athletic festival at the school. The Service Club agree and Meguri has them brainstorm event ideas, all of which are shot down by Shizuka on account of the social sensitivity attached to them. Hachiman decides to enlist the creativity of Yoshiteru and Hina and they soon progress with the preparations. When the festival begins, the white team surges ahead of the red team but the tables turn when Yukino and the red team girls manage to win their historically-based event. Afterwards, Hachiman participates in the male pole-drop event and cleverly uses Yoshiteru as a distraction while he disguises himself as a white player and closes in on the pole. When Hayato and his clique intercept him however, Hachiman reveals his feint strategy in distracting Hayato so Yoshiteru can charge at the pole, thus winning the event and the festival for the red team. Sometime later, the Service Club discuss Hachiman's stunt which caused the disqualification of the red team. However they resolve to try their best in the next athletics festival.

== Home media release ==
NBCUniversal Entertainment Japan released the series in Japan on seven Blu-ray and DVD volumes between June 26 and December 25, 2013. Three of the Limited Edition Blu-ray volumes included bonus light novels of the series. The complete series was released on DVD volumes by Sentai Filmworks on July 22, 2014 and by Madman Entertainment on September 17, 2014. Sentai Filmworks followed with a Blu-ray release on September 1, 2015. These releases contained Japanese audio with English subtitles.

=== Japanese ===
NBCUniversal Entertainment Japan (Region 2 - Japan)
Vol.	Episodes	Blu-ray / DVD artwork	Notable bonus material	Release date	Ref.
1	1	Yukino Yukinoshita	Original Soundtrack / Light Novel (6.25)	June 26, 2013	
2	2, 3	Yui Yuigahama	—	July 24, 2013	
3	4, 5	Komachi Hikigaya	Light Novel (6.50)	August 28, 2013	
4	6, 7	Shizuka Hiratsuka	—	September 25, 2013	
5	8, 9	Saika Totsuka	Light Novel (6.75)	October 23, 2013	
6	10, 11	Haruno Yukinoshita	—	November 27, 2013	
7	12, 13 (EX)	Yui & Yukino	Mini Soundtrack CD	December 25, 2013	

=== English ===
Sentai Filmworks (Region 1 - North America)
Vol.	Episodes	Artwork	Release date	Ref.
DVD	1–13 (EX)	Hachiman, Yukino & Yui	July 22, 2014	
BD	1–13	Hachiman, Yukino & Yui	September 1, 2015	

Madman Entertainment (Region 4 - Australia / New Zealand)
Vol.	Episodes	DVD artwork	DVD Release date	Ref.
1	1–12	Hachiman, Yukino & Yui	September 17, 2014	
