= List of anime broadcast by TBS Television (Japan) =

The following list comprises all anime that has been broadcast on TBS Television, its affiliates (like MBS, which has been affiliated with TBS since April 1, 1975), and related programming blocks like Animeism.

== TV series (all) ==
=== 1960s–2020s ===
Title	Network	Premiere date	End date
Otogi Manga Calendar	TBS	June 25, 1962	July 4, 1964
8 Man	TBS	November 7, 1963	December 31, 1964
Big X	TBS	August 3, 1964	September 27, 1965
Super Jetter	TBS	January 7, 1965	January 20, 1966
Space Boy Soran	TBS	May 4, 1965	March 28, 1967
Obake no Q-Tarō	TBS	August 29, 1965	June 28, 1967
Hang On! Marine Kid	TBS	October 6, 1966	December 29, 1966
Perman	TBS	April 2, 1967	April 14, 1968
Bōken Gabotenjima	TBS	April 4, 1967	December 26, 1967
Skyers 5	TBS	October 4, 1967	December 27, 1967
Sasuke	TBS	September 3, 1968	March 25, 1969
Umeboshi Denka	TBS	April 1, 1969	September 23, 1969
Bakuhatsu Taisho	TBS	April 3, 1970	September 25, 1970
Kick no Oni	TBS	October 2, 1970	March 26, 1971
Golgo 13	TBS	April 1971	July 1971
Marvelous Melmo	ABC	October 3, 1971	March 26, 1972
Shin Skyers 5	TBS	October 7, 1971	March 30, 1972
Ryu, the Cave Boy	TBS	October 30, 1971	March 25, 1972
Triton of the Sea	ABC	April 1, 1972	September 30, 1972
München e no Michi	TBS	April 23, 1972	August 20, 1972
Mon Cheri CoCo	TBS	August 27, 1972	November 26, 1972
The Gutsy Frog	ABC	October 7, 1972	September 28, 1974
Chargeman Ken!	TBS	April 1, 1974	June 28, 1974
Hoshi no Ko Chobin	TBS	April 5, 1974	September 27, 1974
First Human Giatrus	ABC	October 5, 1974	March 29, 1975 (Note: ABC switched affiliates from TBS to NET on March 31, 1975.)
Zoom the White Dolphin	TBS	July 30, 1975	August 15, 1975
Kum-Kum	MBS	October 3, 1975	March 26, 1976
Laura, the Prairie Girl	TBS	October 7, 1975	April 3, 1976
UFO Warrior Dai Apolon	TBS	April 6, 1976	September 28, 1976
Manga Hana no Kakarichō	MBS	October 3, 1976	November 7, 1976
Manga Sekai Mukashi Banashi	TBS	October 7, 1976	March 28, 1979
Robokko Beeton	TBS	October 12, 1976	September 27, 1977
Manga Nihon Emaki	TBS	October 5, 1977	September 27, 1978
Manga Ijin Monogatari	MBS	November 18, 1977	September 29, 1978
Manga Hajimete Monogatari	TBS	May 6, 1978	March 31, 1984
Manga Ijin Monogatari	MBS	October 6, 1978	September 28, 1979
The Ultraman	TBS	April 4, 1979	March 26, 1980

=== 1980s ===
Title	Network	Premiere date	End date
Kirin Ashita no Calendar	MBS	January 1, 1980	October 6, 1984
Ai no Gakko Cuore Monogatari	MBS	April 3, 1981	October 2, 1981
Jarinko Chie	MBS	October 3, 1981	March 25, 1983
Wanwan Sanjushi	MBS	October 9, 1981	March 26, 1982
Super Dimension Fortress Macross	MBS	October 3, 1982	June 26, 1983
Warrior of Love Rainbowman	MBS	October 10, 1982	March 27, 1983
Arcadia of My Youth: Endless Orbit SSX	TBS	October 13, 1982	March 30, 1983
The Many Dream Journeys of Meme	TBS	April 3, 1983	September 29, 1985
Eagle Sam	TBS	April 7, 1983	March 29, 1984
Plawres Sanshiro	TBS	June 5, 1983	February 26, 1984
Super Dimension Century Orguss	MBS	July 3, 1983	April 8, 1984
Ginga Hyōryū Vifam	MBS	October 21, 1983	September 8, 1984
Video Warrior Laserion	TBS	March 4, 1984	February 3, 1985
Manga Doshite Monogatari	TBS	April 7, 1984	March 29, 1986
Super Dimension Cavalry Southern Cross	MBS	April 15, 1984	September 30, 1984
Dancouga – Super Beast Machine God	TBS	April 5, 1985	December 27, 1985
Ultraman Kids' Proverb Stories	TBS	April 16, 1986	November 19, 1986
Wonder Beat Scramble	TBS	April 16, 1986	November 19, 1986
Lady Lady!!	TBS	October 21, 1987	March 23, 1988
Shin Manga Naruhodo Monogatari	TBS	April 2, 1988	January 28, 1989
Manga Hajimete Omoshiro Juku	TBS	February 4, 1989	April 27, 1991
The Laughing Salesman	TBS	October 10, 1989	September 29, 1992

=== 1990s ===
Title	Network	Premiere date	End date
108 Ward Inside and Out: Make-Up Artist	TBS	October 9, 1990	March 5, 1991
Sunset on Third Street	MBS	October 12, 1990	September 21, 1991
Shōnen Ashibe	TBS	April 11, 1991	December 28, 1991
Oh! My Konbu	TBS	May 4, 1991	September 28, 1991
Dragon Quest: The Adventure of Dai	TBS	October 17, 1991	September 24, 1992
Sasurai-kun	TBS	April 7, 1992	June 30, 1992
Shōnen Ashibe 2	TBS	October 3, 1992	March 27, 1993
Mikan Enikki	CBC	October 16, 1992	June 18, 1993
3-Chōme no Tama: Uchi no Tama Shirimasen ka?	MBS	July 3, 1993	August 28, 1993
Muka Muka Paradise	MBS	September 4, 1993	August 27, 1994
3-Chōme no Tama: Uchi no Tama Shirimasen ka?	MBS	April 3, 1994	September 25, 1994
Yamato Takeru	TBS	April 9, 1994	December 24, 1994
Tonde Burin	MBS	September 3, 1994	August 26, 1995
Macross 7	MBS	October 16, 1994	September 24, 1995
Fievel's American Tails	TBS	January 7, 1995	March 25, 1995
Ping Pong Club	TBS	April 6, 1995	September 8, 1995
Mama Loves the Poyopoyo-Saurus	MBS	September 2, 1995	August 31, 1996
The Oz Kids	TBS	October 7, 1995	March 30, 1996
Shōnen Santa no Daibôken	TBS	April 6, 1996	September 21, 1996
B't X	TBS	April 6, 1996	September 21, 1996
You're Under Arrest	TBS	October 5, 1996	September 27, 1997
Kiko-chan's Smile	TBS	October 5, 1996	September 27, 1997
Anime Ganbare Goemon	TBS	October 4, 1997	March 28, 1998
Sakura Momoko Gekijō Coji-Coji	TBS	October 4, 1997	September 25, 1999
Sexy Commando Gaiden: Sugoi yo!! Masaru-san	TBS	January 5, 1998	April 2, 1998
Cyber Team in Akihabara	TBS	April 4, 1998	September 26, 1998
Futari Kurashi	TBS	April 27, 1998	June 29, 1998
Super Radical Gag Family	TBS	June 30, 1998	August 24, 1998
Momoiro Sisters	TBS	August 25, 1998	June 29, 1998
Orphen	TBS	October 3, 1998	March 27, 1999
Let's Nupu-Nupu	TBS	October 6, 1998	November 2, 1998
Only You Viva! Cabaret Club	TBS	November 3, 1998	November 27, 1998
Yoiko	TBS	November 6, 1998	March 26, 1999
If I See You in My Dreams	TBS	December 1, 1998	December 25, 1998
Nihon-ichi no Otoko no Tamashii	TBS	January 1, 1999	January 28, 1999
Iketeru Futari	TBS	February 2, 1999	February 26, 1999
Pet Shop of Horrors	TBS	March 1, 1999	March 25, 1999
You're Under Arrest	TBS	March 29, 1999	April 23, 1999
Power Stone	TBS	April 3, 1999	September 25, 1999
Monster Rancher	CBC	April 17, 1999	September 30, 2000
Nihon-ichi no Otoko no Tamashii 2	TBS	May 4, 1999	May 28, 1999
Surfside High School	TBS	June 1, 1999	July 2, 1999
Let's Dance With Papa	TBS	July 5, 1999	July 24, 1999
Zoids	MBS	September 4, 1999	December 23, 2000
Colorful	TBS	September 6, 1999	September 30, 1999
Orphen: The Revenge	TBS	October 2, 1999	March 26, 2000
Ippatsu Kiki Musume	TBS	October 5, 1999	October 29, 1999
Blue Gender	TBS	October 10, 1999	March 31, 2000
Future Boy Conan II: Taiga Adventure	TBS	October 16, 1999	April 1, 2000
Always the Sun in My Soul	TBS	November 11, 1999	November 26, 1999
Di Gi Charat	TBS	November 29, 1999	December 23, 1999

=== 2000s ===
Title	Network	Premiere date	End date
Miami Guns	MBS	February 5, 2000	May 20, 2000
Monster Rancher: The Legendary Path	CBC	April 1, 2000	September 30, 2000
Sakura Wars	TBS/MBS	April 8, 2000	September 23, 2000
Shin Megami Tensei: DeviChi	CBC	October 7, 2000	September 29, 2001
Invincible King Tri-Zenon	TBS/MBS/CBC	October 14, 2000	March 17, 2001
Zoids: New Century Zero	MBS	January 6, 2001	June 30, 2001
You're Under Arrest	TBS/MBS/CBC	April 7, 2001	September 29, 2001
Go! Go! Itsutsugo Land	TBS	April 14, 2001	March 30, 2002
A Little Snow Fairy Sugar	TBS	October 2, 2001	March 26, 2002
Kirby: Right Back at Ya!	CBC	October 6, 2001	September 27, 2003
Rave Master	TBS/MBS/CBC	October 13, 2001	September 28, 2002
Chobits	TBS	April 2, 2002	September 24, 2002
Heat Guy J	TBS	October 1, 2002	March 25, 2003
GetBackers	TBS	October 5, 2002	September 20, 2003
Mobile Suit Gundam SEED	MBS	October 5, 2002	September 27, 2003
Tantei Gakuen Q	TBS	April 15, 2003	March 20, 2004
Fullmetal Alchemist	MBS	October 4, 2003	October 2, 2004
Melody of Oblivion	TBS	April 6, 2004	September 21, 2004
Sweet Valerian	MBS	August 1, 2004	December 19, 2004
Rozen Maiden	TBS	October 7, 2004	December 23, 2004
Zipang	TBS	October 7, 2004	March 31, 2005
Mobile Suit Gundam SEED Destiny	MBS	October 9, 2004	October 1, 2005
Ah! My Goddess	TBS	January 6, 2005	July 7, 2005
Psalms of Planets Eureka SeveN	MBS	April 17, 2005	June 18, 2005
Strawberry Marshmallow	TBS	July 14, 2005	October 13, 2005
Black Cat	TBS	October 6, 2005	March 30, 2006
Blood+	MBS	October 8, 2005	September 23, 2006
Rozen Maiden: Träumend	TBS	October 20, 2005	January 26, 2006
Binchō-tan	TBS	February 2, 2006	March 30, 2006
REC	TBS	February 3, 2006	March 31, 2006
Witchblade	CBC	April 6, 2006	September 21, 2006
xxxHolic	TBS	April 6, 2006	September 28, 2006
Ah! My Goddess: Flights of Fancy	TBS	April 6, 2006	September 14, 2006
The Galaxy Railways: Crossroads to Eternity	CBC	October 4, 2006	December 21, 2006
009-1	TBS	October 5, 2006	December 21, 2006
Asatte no Houkou	TBS	October 5, 2006	December 21, 2006
Code Geass: Lelouch of the Rebellion	MBS	October 6, 2006	March 30, 2007
Tenpō Ibun Ayakashi Ayashi	MBS	October 7, 2006	March 31, 2007
Winter Garden	TBS	December 22, 2006	December 23, 2006
Rozen Maiden: Ouverture	TBS	December 22, 2006	December 23, 2006
Hidamari Sketch	TBS	January 11, 2007	March 29, 2007
Venus Versus Virus	TBS	January 11, 2007	March 29, 2007
Shinkyoku Sōkai Polyphonica	TBS	April 3, 2007	June 19, 2007
Romeo X Juliet	CBC	April 4, 2007	September 26, 2007
Darker than Black	MBS	April 6, 2007	September 29, 2007
Lovely Complex	TBS	April 7, 2007	September 29, 2007
Terra e...	MBS	April 7, 2007	September 29, 2007
Big Windup!	TBS/MBS	April 12, 2007	June 24, 2010
Princess Resurrection	TBS	April 13, 2007	September 28, 2007
Clannad	TBS	October 4, 2007	March 27, 2008
You're Under Arrest: Full Throttle	TBS	October 4, 2007	March 27, 2008
Shakugan no Shana II	MBS	October 5, 2007	March 28, 2008
Mobile Suit Gundam 00 (season 1)	MBS	October 6, 2007	March 29, 2008
Noramimi	CBC	January 9, 2008	December 17, 2008
Macross Frontier	MBS	April 3, 2008	September 25, 2008
xxxHolic: Kei	TBS	April 3, 2008	June 25, 2008
To Love Ru	TBS	April 4, 2008	September 26, 2008
Itazura na Kiss	CBC	April 4, 2008	September 26, 2008
Code Geass: Lelouch of the Rebellion R2	MBS	April 6, 2008	September 28, 2008
Hidamari Sketch x 365	TBS	July 3, 2008	September 25, 2008
Kuroshitsuji	MBS	October 2, 2008	March 26, 2009
Yozakura Quartet	TBS	October 2, 2008	December 18, 2008
Clannad After Story	TBS	October 2, 2008	March 26, 2009
Linebarrels of Iron	CBC	October 3, 2008	March 20, 2009
Mobile Suit Gundam 00 (season 2)	MBS	October 5, 2008	March 29, 2009
Asu no Yoichi!	TBS	January 8, 2009	March 26, 2009
Sengoku Basara	CBC/MBS	April 1, 2009	June 17, 2009
Basquash!	MBS	April 2, 2009	October 1, 2009
Pandora Hearts	TBS	April 2, 2009	September 24, 2009
K-On!	TBS	April 3, 2009	June 28, 2009
Fullmetal Alchemist: Brotherhood	MBS	April 5, 2009	July 4, 2010
Weiß Survive	TBS	June 5, 2009	September 18, 2009
Umi Monogatari	CBC	June 24, 2009	September 17, 2009
Taishō Baseball Girls	TBS	July 2, 2009	September 24, 2009
Nyan Koi!	TBS	October 1, 2009	December 17, 2009
Kämpfer	TBS	October 2, 2009	December 18, 2009
Darker than Black: Gemini of the Meteor	MBS	October 8, 2009	December 24, 2009
Weiß Survive R	TBS	December 4, 2009	March 19, 2010

=== 2010s ===
Title	Network	Premiere date	End date
Ōkami Kakushi	TBS	January 7, 2010	March 25, 2010
Durarara!!	MBS	January 8, 2010	June 25, 2010
Kaichou Wa Maid-Sama!	TBS	April 1, 2010	September 23, 2010
Angel Beats!	CBC/MBS	April 3, 2010	June 26, 2010
Amagami SS	TBS	July 2, 2010	December 23, 2010
Star Driver	MBS	October 3, 2010	April 4, 2011
Infinite Stratos	TBS	January 7, 2011	April 1, 2011
Dream Eater Merry	TBS	January 7, 2011	April 8, 2011
Puella Magi Madoka Magica	MBS	January 7, 2011	April 21, 2011
Suzy's Zoo Daisuki! Witzy	TBS	April 3, 2011	September 25, 2011
Aria the Scarlet Ammo	TBS	April 15, 2011	July 1, 2011
Blue Exorcist	MBS	April 17, 2011	October 2, 2011
Mayo Chiki!	TBS	July 7, 2011	September 29, 2011
The Idolmaster	TBS	July 8, 2011	December 23, 2011
Boku wa Tomodachi ga Sukunai	TBS	October 7, 2011	December 23, 2011
Kill Me Baby	TBS	January 5, 2012	March 29, 2012
Acchi Kocchi	TBS	April 5, 2012	June 28, 2012
Sankarea: Undying Love	TBS	April 5, 2012	June 28, 2012
Koi to Senkyo to Chocolate	TBS	July 6, 2012	September 28, 2012
Kono Naka ni Hitori, Imouto ga Iru!	TBS	July 6, 2012	September 28, 2012
Love, Election and Chocolate	TBS	July 6, 2012	September 28, 2012
Busou Shinki	TBS	October 4, 2012	December 20, 2012
Blood of Tempest	MBS	October 5, 2012	March 29, 2013
My Teen Romantic Comedy SNAFU	TBS	April 5, 2013	June 28, 2013
Photo Kano	TBS	April 5, 2013	June 28, 2013
Attack on Titan (season 1)	MBS/TBS/Tokyo MX	April 7, 2013	September 29, 2013
Outbreak Company	TBS	October 3, 2013	December 19, 2013
Magical Warfare	TBS	January 9, 2014	March 27, 2014
Sakura Trick	TBS	January 9, 2014	March 27, 2014
Bokura wa Minna Kawaisou	TBS	April 3, 2014	June 19, 2014
Locodol	TBS	July 4, 2014	September 18, 2014
Rail Wars!	TBS	July 4, 2014	September 19, 2014
The Seven Deadly Sins	MBS	October 5, 2014	March 29, 2015
Amagi Brilliant Park	TBS	October 6, 2014	December 25, 2014
Unlimited Fafnir	TBS	January 8, 2015	March 26, 2015
Koufuku Graffiti	TBS	January 9, 2015	March 27, 2015
My Teen Romantic Comedy SNAFU Too!	TBS	April 3, 2015	June 26, 2015
Lance N' Masques	TBS	October 1, 2015	December 17, 2015
Young Black Jack	TBS	October 1, 2015	December 17, 2015
Aggretsuko	TBS/Netflix	April 2, 2016	March 31, 2018
My Hero Academia (season 1)	MBS	April 3, 2016	June 26, 2016
Shōnen Maid	TBS	April 8, 2016	July 1, 2016
Magi: Adventure of Sinbad	MBS	April 23, 2016	July 2, 2016
Kamiwaza Wanda	TBS	April 23, 2016	March 25, 2017
The Heroic Legend of Arslan: Dust Storm Dance	MBS	July 3, 2016	August 21, 2016
This Art Club Has a Problem!	TBS	July 7, 2016	September 22, 2016
The Seven Deadly Sins: Signs of Holy War	MBS	August 28, 2016	September 18, 2016
Seiren	TBS	January 5, 2017	March 23, 2017
Urara Meirocho	TBS	January 5, 2017	March 23, 2017
Blue Exorcist: Kyoto Saga	MBS	January 7, 2017	March 25, 2017
Attack on Titan (season 2)	MBS/TBS/Tokyo MX	April 1, 2017	June 17, 2017
The Seven Deadly Sins: Revival of The Commandments	MBS	January 13, 2018	June 30, 2018
Magical Girl Site	MBS	April 6, 2018	June 22, 2018
Seven Senses of the Reunion	TBS	July 6, 2018	September 21, 2018
Happy Sugar Life	MBS	July 14, 2018	September 29, 2018
The Quintessential Quintuplets	TBS	January 9, 2019	March 28, 2019
Grimms Notes The Animation	TBS	January 10, 2019	March 28, 2019
The Demon Girl Next Door	TBS	July 12, 2019	July 1, 2022
No Guns Life (Season 1)	TBS/BS11/AT-X	October 11, 2019	December 27, 2019

=== 2020s ===
Title	Network	Premiere date	End date
Toilet-Bound Hanako-kun	TBS	January 9, 2020	March 26, 2020
If My Favorite Pop Idol Made It to the Budokan, I Would Die	TBS	January 10, 2020	March 27, 2020
My Teen Romantic Comedy SNAFU Climax	TBS	July 9, 2020	September 24, 2020
No Guns Life (Season 2)	TBS/BS11/AT-X	July 10, 2020	September 25, 2020
Jujutsu Kaisen	MBS/TBS	October 3, 2020	March 27, 2021
The Quintessential Quintuplets ∬	TBS	January 8, 2021	March 26, 2021
Mobile Suit Gundam: The Witch from Mercury (Season 1)	MBS	October 2, 2022	January 8, 2023
Legend of Mana: The Teardrop Crystal	MBS	October 8, 2022	December 24, 2022
Undead Unluck	MBS	October 7, 2023	March 23, 2024
Go! Go! Loser Ranger!	TBS/BS11/AT-X/Disney+	April 7, 2024	
Mission: Yozakura Family (Season 1)	MBS	April 7, 2024	October 6, 2024
DAN DA DAN	TBS	October 4, 2024	
Gachiakuta	CBC/TBS	July 6, 2025	
Mission: Yozakura Family (Season 2, First Cour)	MBS	April 12, 2026	June 28, 2026
Mission: Yozakura Family (Season 2, Second Cour)	MBS	October 11, 2026	

== Films and specials ==
- Toshishun (April 12, 1981)
- Otoko wa Tsurai yo: Torajirō Wasure na Kusa (August 7, 1998)

== See also ==
- List of programs broadcast by TBS Television (Japan)
