= Asai Kikaku =

Japanese talent agency

Asai Kikaku Co., Ltd
- Native name: 株式会社浅井企画
- Company type: Private KK
- Traded as: Unlisted
- Industry: Service industry (entertainment)
- Genre: Tarento management, entertainment production
- Founded: September 1968
- Headquarters: Higashigotanda, Shinagawa, Tokyo, Japan
- Area served: Japan
- Key people: Ryoichi Asai (Representative director and president)
- Number of employees: 30
- Website: www.asaikikaku.co.jp

Asai Kikaku Co., Ltd (株式会社浅井企画) is a Japanese talent agency and entertainment production company headquartered in Higashigotanda, Shinagawa, Tokyo. It was found in 1968 by Ryoji Asai, who at the time was a manager working under Nakagawa Production, a talent agency for actors. Ryoji Asai was also responsible for scouting comedian talents such as Kinichi Hagimoto and Jirō Sakagami. Asai Kikaku is currently one of the largest talent agencies in Tokyo with a focus on variety tarento and comedians.

Asai Kikaku also partakes in casting and assistance in production for media, television and films. Notable examples include Sengoku Basara – Moonlight Party (2012) and Gaki Rock (2014).

In October 2018, Ryoji Asai died and his son Ryoichi Asai succeeded the company.

== Notable talents ==
=== Comedians ===
- Kinichi Hagimoto
- Kazuki Kosakai
- Kyaeen (Udo Suzuki, Hiroyuki Amano)
- Anzen Manzai (Miyazon, Arapon)
- Nagareboshi (Chuei, Shinichiro Takiue)
- Tsutomu Sekine
- Zun (Kazuki Iiyo, Yasu)

=== Others ===
- Reiko Hayama (actress)
- Ami Inamura (television personality)
- Mari Kumamoto (pianist)
- Koichi Nakano (former racing cyclist)
- Daishi Nobuyuki (former sumo wrestler)
- Neko Oikawa (lyricist)
- Atsuko Okamoto (actress)
- Hideo Tokoro (mixed martial artist)
- Yuka Yoshida (former professional tennis player)

== Former notable talents ==
- Hiroshi Aramata (author)
- Mackenyu Arata (actor)
- Mayuko Arisue (model)
- Sonny Chiba (actor)
- Koriki Choshu (comedian)
- Mika Katsumura (actress)
- Midori Kinouchi (idol)
- Yū Mizushima (voice actress)
- Kurama Tatsuya (former sumo wrestler)
- Jirō Sakagami (former comedian)
- Sugi-chan (comedian)
- Kaoru Sugita (actress)
- Misako Tanaka (actress)
