= List of programs broadcast by TBS Television (Japan) =

The following is a list of television programs broadcast by TBS Television. Programs are listed in each section in chronological order.

== Current programming ==
=== Anime ===
- Ajin: Demi-Human (2016–)

=== Kids ===
- The Angry Beavers (1997–)
- RoboRoach (2002–)
- Yoko! Jakamoko! Toto! (2002–)
- Christopher Crocodile (1992–)

=== Dramas ===
- Kazoku no Katachi (2016–)

=== Game shows ===
- Honoo-no Taiiku-kai TV (2011–)
- Sasuke (1997–)
- Sports Danshi Grand Prix (2012–)
- KASSO (2024-)

=== Other ===
- All-Star Thanksgiving (1991–)
- Count Down TV (1993–)

== Future programming ==
- Kamiwaza Wanda (2016–)
- Kono Bijutsubu ni wa Mondai ga Aru! (2016–)
- Girlish Number
- IndyCar Series

== Former programming ==
=== Anime ===
- Otogi Manga Calendar (1962–1964)
- 8 Man (1963–1964)
- Big X (1964–1965)
- Obake no Q-tarō (1965–1967)
- Kaibutsu-kun (1968–1969)
- Kick no Oni (1970–1971)
- Marvelous Melmo (1971–1972)
- Dokonjō Gaeru (1972–1974)
- Kōya no Shōnen Isamu (1973–1974)
- Chargeman Ken! (1974)
- First Human Giatrus (1974–1976)
- Hoshi no Ko Chobin (1974)
- Kum-Kum (1975–1976)
- UFO Warrior Dai Apolon (1976–1977)
- The Ultraman (1979–1980)
- Super Dimension Fortress Macross (1982–1983)
- Wonder Beat Scramble (1986)
- Lady Lady!! (1987–1988)
- The Laughing Salesman (1989–1992)
- Dragon Quest: Dai no Daibōken (1991–1992)
- Tonde Burin (1994–1995)
- Yamato Takeru (1994)
- Mama Loves the Poyopoyo-Saurus (1995–1996)
- B't X (1996)
- You're Under Arrest (1996–1997)
- Anime Ganbare Goemon (1997–1998)
- B't X Neo (1997)
- Yoiko (1998–1999)
- Blue Gender (1999–2000)
- Di Gi Charat (1999)
- Iketeru Futari (1999)
- Monster Rancher (1999–2001)
- Pet Shop of Horrors (1999)
- Power Stone (1999)
- You're Under Arrest (1999)
- Di Gi Charat - Christmas Special (2000)
- Di Gi Charat - Summer Special 2000 (2000)
- Miami Guns (2000)
- Di Gi Charat - Natsuyasumi Special (2001)
- Di Gi Charat - Ohamami Special (2001)
- Di Gi Charat - Tsuyu Special (2001)
- Go! Go! Itsutsugo Land (2001–2002)
- Rave Master (2001–2002)
- You're Under Arrest (2001)
- Chobits (2002)
- GetBackers (2002–2003)
- Heat Guy J (2002–2003)
- Mobile Suit Gundam SEED (2002–2003)
- Detective School Q (2003–2004)
- Fullmetal Alchemist (2003–2004)
- Melody of Oblivion (2004)
- PostPet Momobin (2004–2005)
- This Ugly Yet Beautiful World (2004)
- Zipang (2004)
- Ah! My Goddess (2005–2006)
- Black Cat (2005–2006)
- Blood+ (2005–2006)
- 009-1 (2006)
- Ah! My Goddess: Flights of Fancy (2006)
- Binchō-tan (2006)
- Winter Garden (2006)
- Kanon (2006–2007)
- Code Geass: Lelouch of the Rebellion (2006–2007)
- Living for the Day After Tomorrow (2006)
- Rec (2006)
- Darker than Black (2007)
- Love Com (2007)
- Oh! Edo Rocket (2007)
- Ōkiku Furikabutte (2007)
- Princess Resurrection (2007)
- Romeo × Juliet (2007)
- Venus Versus Virus (2007)
- You're Under Arrest: Full Throttle (2007–2008)
- Itazura na Kiss (2008)
- To Love-Ru (2008)
- Darker than Black: Gemini of the Meteor (2009)
- Fullmetal Alchemist: Brotherhood (2009–2010)
- K-On! (2009)
- Kämpfer (2009)
- Pandora Hearts (2009)
- Umi Monogatari (2009)
- Amagami SS (2010)
- And Yet the Town Moves (2010)
- K-On!! (2010)
- Maid Sama! (2010)
- Ōkami Kakushi (2010)
- Ōkiku Furikabutte ~Natsu no Taikai-hen~ (2010)
- A Channel (2011)
- Dororon Enma-kun Meeramera (2011)
- Dream Eater Merry (2011)
- Haganai (2011)
- The Idolmaster (2011)
- Infinite Stratos (2011)
- Kämpfer für die Liebe (2011)
- Mobile Suit Gundam AGE (2011–2012)
- Puella Magi Madoka Magica (2011)
- Amagami SS+ plus (2012)
- Blast of Tempest (2012–2013)
- Busou Shinki (2012)
- Eureka Seven: AO (2012)
- K (2012)
- Kill Me Baby (2012)
- Nakaimo - My Sister Is Among Them! (2012)
- Natsuiro Kiseki (2012)
- Place to Place (2012)
- Devil Survivor 2: The Animation (2013)
- Haganai NEXT (2013)
- Infinite Stratos 2 (2013)
- Kill la Kill (2013–2014)
- My Teen Romantic Comedy SNAFU (2013)
- Outbreak Company (2013)
- Photo Kano (2013)
- Vividred Operation (2013)
- Gundam Reconguista in G (2014–2015)
- Knights of Sidonia (2014)
- Locodol (2014)
- Magical Warfare (2014)
- Rail Wars! (2014)
- Riddle Story of Devil (2014)
- The Heroic Legend of Arslan (2015)
- K: Return of Kings (2015)
- Knights of Sidonia: War of the Ninth Planet (2015)
- My Teen Romantic Comedy SNAFU TOO! (2015)
- Re-Kan! (2015)
- Unlimited Fafnir (2015)

=== Dramas ===
- Key Hunter (1968–1973)
- Nantatte 18 sai! (1971–1972)
- Akai Meiro (1974–1975)
- Kinpachi-sensei (1979–2011)
- Aoi Zesshō (1980–1981)
- Miracle Girl (1980–1982)
- Omoide Zukuri (1981)
- Natsu ni Koisuru Onnatachi (1983)
- Mujaki na Kankei (1984)
- Ponytail wa Furimukanai (1985–1986)
- Uchi no Ko ni Kagitte... (1985–1986)
- Tsūkai! OL Dōri (1986)
- Wataru Seken wa Oni Bakari (1990)
- Oka no Ue no Himawari (1993)
- Aishiteiru to Itte Kure (1995)
- Keizoku (1999)
- Majo no Jōken (1999)
- Salaryman Kintarō (1999–2004)
- Beautiful Life (2000)
- Strawberry on the Shortcake (2001)
- Kisarazu Cat's Eye (2002)
- Good Luck!! (2003)
- Stand Up! (2003)
- Tramps Like Us (2003)
- Orange Days (2004)
- Socrates in Love (2004)
- Aikurushii (2005)
- H2: Kimi to Ita Hibi (2005)
- Hana Yori Dango (2005)
- Dragon Zakura (2005)
- Bengoshi no Kuzu (2006)
- Dare Yorimo Mama o Ai su (2006)
- Journey Under the Midnight Sun (2006)
- Sailor Suit and Machine Gun (2006)
- Hana Yori Dango Returns (2007)
- Karei-naru Ichizoku (2007)
- Yamada Tarō Monogatari (2007)
- Bloody Monday (2008)
- Maō (2008)
- Ryokiteki na Kanojo (2008)
- Ryūsei no Kizuna (2008)
- Drifting Net Cafe (2009)
- Jin (2009–2011)
- Love Shuffle (2009)
- Orthros no Inu (2009)
- Smile (2009)
- Flunk Punk Rumble (2010)
- Shinzanmono (2010)
- The Wallflower (2010)
- Heaven's Flower The Legend of Arcana (2011)
- Ikemen desu ne (2011)
- Kaitō Royale (2011)
- Nankyoku Tairiku (2011)
- Ouran High School Host Club (2011)
- Watashi wa Shadow (2011)
- Ataru (2012)
- Hana no Zubora-Meshi (2012)
- Monsters (2012)
- Ōoku: The Inner Chambers (2012)
- Perfect Blue (2012)
- Renai Neet: Wasureta Koi no Hajimekata (2012)
- Resident – 5-nin no Kenshui (2012)
- Andō Lloyd: A.I. knows Love? (2013)
- Hanzawa Naoki (2013)
- Higanjima (Island of the Equinox) (2013)
- Pin to Kona (2013)
- Mozu (2014)
- The Emperor's Cook (2015)
- Ouroboros (2015)
- Yamegoku: Yakuza Yamete Itadakimasu (2015)

=== Films ===
- Dark Tales of Japan (2004)
- Nemuri no Mori (2014)

=== Jidaigeki ===
- Mito Kōmon (1969–2011)
- Ōoka Echizen (1970–1999)
- Edo o Kiru (1973–1994)

=== Tokusatsu ===
- Ultra Q (1966)
- Captain Ultra (1967)
- Ultra Seven (1967–1968)
- Ultra Fight (1970–1971)
- The Return of Ultraman (1971–1972)
- Iron King (1972–1973)
- Ultraman Ace (1972–1973)
- Ultraman Taro (1973–1974)
- Ultraman Leo (1974–1975)
- Kamen Rider Stronger (1975)
- Ultraman 80 (1980–1981)
- Ultraman Tiga (1996–1997)
- Ultraman Gaia (1998–1999)

=== Variety shows ===
- Minna de Deyou 55-go Ketteiban! (1969–1975)
- Hachiji da yo! Zen'in shūgō (1969–1985)
- Kato-chan Ken-chan Gokigen TV (1986–1992)
- Utaban (1996–2010)
- Koko ga Hen da yo Nihonjin (1998–2002)
- Koisuru Hanikami (2003–2009)
- Lincoln (2005–2013)

=== Other ===
- Kinniku Banzuke (1995–2001)
- Kunoichi (2001–2018)
- Pro Sportsman No.1 (1995–2010)
- Sesame Street' (1970–2016)
- Takeshi's Castle' (1986–1990)
- The Puzzle Place' (1996–2000)

== See also ==
- List of anime aired on TBS, an alphabetical list of all anime broadcast by TBS
