= Kinichi Hagimoto =

Japanese comedian (born 1941)

- Born: May 7, 1941 (age 85); Tokyo, Japan

Comedy career
- Years active: 1964 – present
- Medium: Owarai; Television; Stage
- Genre: Owarai

Notes
- Same year/generation as: Kiyoshi Nishikawa

Kinichi Hagimoto (萩本 欽一, Hagimoto Kin'ichi; born May 7, 1941) is a Japanese comedian. He is active as a stage performer, emcee, and manager of the amateur Ibaraki Golden Golds (ibaraki goruden goruzu) of the Japanese Baseball Association (nippon yakyuu renmei).

Born in the Taito ward of Tokyo, Japan, he graduated from Komagome High School, and now belongs to the Asai Kikaku talent agency.

He is called "Kin-chan" by fans and those within the entertainment industry. He is also known as "Hagimo", "Kin", etc. Amongst the many entertainers he has developed on his shows, who are known as the "Kinchan Family", he is known as "Taisho" ("The General").

In the 1970s and 80s, with acts like "nande so naru no!" ("Why does that happen?!") and physical comedy such as his distinctive "Kinchan run" (based on Hachiro Azuma) he blossomed into a polished professional. Many of his famous lines like "dochira dake" and "banzaai nashi yo" are still heard today. Some comedic jargon such as "ukeru" (and "yaya uke", "baka uke", etc.) that have become common Japanese words are said to have originated from his variety show Kinchan No Don To Itte Miyo. He presented three successful variety programmes in the 1970s and 1980s, and by the mid-1980s was one of the most popular comedians on Japanese television.

== Biography ==
=== Before Konto 55-go ===
Hagimoto aspired for a career as an entertainer as far back as junior high school times, when after graduation he approached the local Asakusa comedic legend Toshimitsu Omiya to ask for an apprenticeship, but was told to at least finish high school first.

After high school he was at last slated to enter Omiya’s Asakusa Shochiku Engeijō comedic troupe through an introduction by the Toyo Gekijo (Toyo Kogyo Keiei) troupe of the Asakusa Koen Rokku red-light entertainment district. However, after being told by Omiya "you can always come to our place if it doesn't work out there" he stopped at the last minute and went to nearby Tōyō Gekijō instead.

He started out as an apprentice. At Toyo Gekijo, he took direction from many veterans such as Shin-ichi Ike, Eiji Ishida, and Hachiro Azuma. He was taken under the wing of their master and head of the Asakusa scene, Senzaburo Fukami (the master of Beat Takeshi, who later scolded Hagimoto for trying to conceal his beginnings in the Asakusa burlesque scene after moving on to television).

After developing at Toyo Gekijo, he moved to the affiliated Asakusa Furansu-Za, where he polished his act doing intermission skits. It was there that he met comedian and later partner Roru Ando (later known as Jiro Sakagami). At that time, however, they were more rivals than partners, competing to get laughs. His impression of Sakagami was "If I perform with him I'll get upstaged."

After this he left Toyo Gekijo and went through some other troupes, then headlined the newly formed Gekidan Asakusa Shinkigeki at Asakusa Shochiku Engeijo. During that time, he trained under broadcast writer Katsuo Hamaka and undertook the creation of true professional comedy. At that time he also met Michio Iwashiro, who would later be responsible for most of the lines for the Hagimoto's Konto 55-go act. Also, through Hamaka's connections, he met TBS network producer Sōya Mukai and entertainment manager Ryoji Asai (head of Asai Kikaku), and began his career as a professional talent. He appeared in a commercial for a comedy program that Mukai was handling called "Jintaka Panchi". However it took him 22 filming takes, perhaps due to nerves, and he was compelled to quit.

The disappointed Hagimoto gave up on a television career and decided to focus on a stage career. He broke up the Asakusa Shinkigeki, and started anew at the Atami Tsuruya Hotel. There he came up with the solo skit "Tsukue", which would later be an early staple for Konto 55-go which took Japan by storm.

During the time with Katsuo Hamaka, he was a friend of Shin-ichi Ichikawa, who would make his scriptwriting debut with the television series Kaiju Busuka. He would later write for the Nippon Television 40th anniversary special drama Goruden Boizu ("Golden Boys") in which a young Hagimoto appeared (with Kazuki Kosakai).

=== Konto 55-go ===
He formed the "Konto 55-go" ("Skit #55") duo after an invitation from Jiro Sakagami in 1966, originally for a one-act contract (according to them, they had become a regular act without realizing it after renewing several times).

They became a sensation appearing on the live program Ohiru no goruden sho with Takehiko Maeda on Fuji Television (1968–71). After this, they dominated television with programs such as Konto 55-go no Sekai Wa Warau (Fuji TV), Konto 55-go no Urabangumi wo Buttobase! and Konto 55-go no Nande Sou Naru No? (NTV), Chimu 55-go and Minna de Deyou 55-go Ketteiban! (TBS), Whoa! Konto 55-go!! and Konto 55-go!! Waratte tamaru ka!? (NET TV, now Asahi TV). They continued performing as a duo after that, but gradually started a solo career as well starting in 1975 as the star of the hit show Pittashi Kan-Kan (TBS) hosted by Hiroshi Kume.

=== Shichoritsu 100% Otoko (100% viewer rating man) ===
He appeared solo from 1972 on the Nippon Broadcasting radio program Kinchan No Don To Itte Miyō!!. The program based mostly on letters from listeners rose in popularity and debuted on television in 1975 on a Saturday night slot on Fuji Television. At the same time he was hosting Oru suta kazoku taikou utagassen ("all-star family singing battle") (1972–1986, Hagimoto until June 1984) on the same network and Suta Tanjo! ("birth of a star") (Nippon Television), where he developed a style of interacting with the family of guests and amateur extras. This was expanded in shows such as Kin Don! which featured a cast of primarily amateurs called the Kin Don Gekidan, and in features interacting with passersby while walking down streets on location, and mastered to perfection in later shows.

When given proposals for new shows, he often responded, "I can't emcee, so I want you to hire a girl who can emcee properly." It is said that this was the beginning of the "assistant" role in shows.

Later in 1981 his series Kin Don! Yoi Ko Warui Ko Futsu no Ko (Fuji Television) began on Mondays at 9:00 pm. After continued high ratings in his next shows Kinchan No Doko Made Yaru No!? (Kin doko) on Asahi in 1976 and "Kinchan no Shukan Kin-yobi" (TBS) in 1982, he picked up the nickname "100% Otoko", reflecting the sum of the ratings for the three shows. The many celebrities whose careers were born on these shows became known as the "Kinchan Family".

Hagimoto is not only skilled at making ordinary performers into professional comedians, but also in drawing out the comedic side of celebrities. Among those he developed into comedic starts includes Kiyoshi Maekawa (singer, previously a "cool" character actor), Hiroshi Uchiyama and Cool Five (mood ballad group), Rie Nakahara (young ballad singer), Junko Maya (formerly a stage actress), and Masaru Shiga (villain actor).

However, though Hagimoto's popularity and fame rose through his programs, many stars were washed up in the process. By appearing on his programs, many stars sacrificed their acting or musical careers. Though their renewed popularity was mostly due to Hagimoto's talents, many became overconfident in their own abilities. One example is Seiroku Saito, who gained sudden fame appearing on Kin Doko, but was rarely seen on television afterward.

Aside from starring in and producing top-rate variety programs, he became the face of programs beginning with Suta Tanjo (NTV) in 1971, continuing with Oru sta Kazoku Taiko Utagassen (Fuji) as host, the still running 24-Jikan Terebi ("24 Hour Television") (NTV) from 1978, and also in radio on the Rajio Chariti Myujikkuson ("Radio Charity Music-thon") (Nippon Hoso) from 1975.

Hagimoto went on a six-month "recharge" hiatus from all his regular programs starting in March 1985. He stated that he didn't have the confidence to maintain the popularity of his "100% Otoko" level, also commenting that he was tired of the ad lib style programs that were becoming popular at the time. He reportedly never liked ad-lib, often begging partner Sakagami backstage to stick to the script. However, in regards to requests from NTV director Takao Saito to follow the script he commented that "performers have pride as performers", and was known to ad-lib on stage at times. Regarding the hiatus he was also noted afterward as saying that he felt down about the start of a downward trend in ratings.

=== Post-hiatus ===
After returning from hiatus, he returned to television but struggled with the failure of subsequent programs, and saw the surrender of his early '80s spot in the "Owarai Big 3" with Beat Takeshi and Tamori to Sanma Akashiya. However, he still regularly appears on television such as on Kinchan & Katori Shingo no Zen-Nihon Kaso Taisho ("Kinchan & Shingo Katori's All-Japan Costume Grand Prix"), and is still a household name. He hosted the closing ceremonies of the Nagano Olympics in 1998. Since 1980, he has been active organizing the Kinchan Gekidan with Kiyoshi Maegawa, performing on stage.

== Kinchan baseball club ==
As a boy he loved baseball and was devoted to his high school team. Perhaps due to that and a lament for the recent decline in baseball's popularity in Japan, he aimed to show the fun of baseball by starting the Kantō-based amateur baseball "Ibaraki Golden Golds" (based in Sakuragawa-mura, now Inashiki-shi, Ibaraki) of the Nippon Yakyū Renmei (Japanese Baseball Association) on December 26, 2004. With an unprecedented collection of former professional players, comedians, and a female player he created the most popular amateur team ever. This started a trend of clubs started by celebrities such as Kensaku Morita, Jōji Yamamoto, and Hiroshi Moriguchi, and made a large contribution to the revival of baseball's popularity.

Within the team, rather than the usual Hagimoto-kantoku (Coach Hagimoto) he is called Kintoku, an abbreviation of Kinichi-kantoku. During exhibition games, he is known to hold the mike and give running commentary on the game or encourage the players, drawing the crowd into the game. In addition, he has formed a sister team, the Miyazaki Golden Golds.

=== Hokkaidō incident ===
On July 19, 2006, while on an exhibition road trip to Hokkaidō, team member and former comedic duo Gokuraku Tonbo member Kei-ichi Yamamoto was charged with sexual assault on a 17-year-old girl. He was dismissed from his talent agency Yoshimoto Kogyo the same day. The following morning, Hagimoto announced his intention to break up the team, having previously told the amateur baseball federation of his intention to break up the team a full eight hours before his public announcement.

The announcement caused waves, with local residents circulating a petition to continue the team and media surveys also showing widespread support for continuing. On the field before a game with Sega Sammy in Niigata Prefecture on July 22, he reversed his decision to break up the team.

Though there was strong support for him from the media and public opinion, he was criticized by some athletes for breaking up the team based on his own feelings then just as whimsically retreating on his statement due to the public reaction without properly considering the feelings of the players who had no involvement with the incident. Also, his leadership skills were questioned since he did not take personal responsibility as manager. Furthermore, there was no apology for the fact that other players were involved in the incident.

In addition, at the time of the breakup announcement in front of cameras when asked if he had a message for Yamamoto he said, "now the team is gone!", but when repealing the announcement he suddenly changed his tone, saying, "why you don't come out one night when there're no fans wearing a uniform with no number and hang out with us just as Yamamoto". In an interview with the show Waido! Sukuranburu ("Wide! Scramble") he mentioned the possibility of Yamamoto returning at first as a ball boy with the uniform number 0. However, he also made large roster changes to the team and commented other times that there was no possibility of Yamamoto's return, causing uncertainty surrounding the team. In January 2007 Yamamoto appeared at a public team workout and personally apologized to Hagimoto. However, Hagimoto made comments to the effect that he had still not forgiven Yamamoto.

== Other ==
=== Meeting with Chaplin ===
In 1971 Hagimoto met with Charlie Chaplin, who was living in seclusion in Switzerland at the time, for a Fuji Television production. It all started when Hagimoto mentioned Chaplin as a comedian he respected. Actually, Hagimoto only mentioned his name because "he is the most famous comedian on earth", while only having seen Chaplin's movies a couple of times.

At the time, it was said that Chaplin would not meet anyone, and the production staff was uncertain whether it would actually happen, but a confident Hagimoto set off for Switzerland. Hagimoto was given 4 days. On the first day, as feared he was told by carers that Chaplin was not available. The next day, they were able to see Chaplin in his car as he returned home but were not allowed on his property. They were advised by Toraichi Kouno, a former driver for Chaplin, that "if there was a woman he would probably meet with you" and "he likes Japanese". Hagimoto brought a Hakata doll as a gift to the house and was told by Chaplin's manager that they would take the gift, but only tell Chaplin of the visitor from Japan. On the last day, Hagimoto persisted by trying to explain that he just came to express his respect for the man, but was refused by the manager again. An angry and frustrated Hagimoto started yelling in Japanese, "That movie (full of humanism) is just a lie!" Chaplin, who overheard the commotion, came out to see what was happening, and warmly greeted him. According to Hagimoto, the manager explained that various extortionists constantly visit the house so he refused unsolicited visitors access to Chaplin.

After the visit, Hagimoto has had a deep respect for Chaplin and has even watched all his works. In December 1977 during the Nippon Broadcasting Rajio Chariti Myujikkuson news of Chaplin's death was reported by Hagimoto, who spontaneously started crying.

=== Wedding reports and family ===
Around the time he became a star while doing Kin Don! Hagimoto announced his marriage, but withheld his bride's name and asked the press to respect their privacy. This was because she was a show dancer he knew during his humble early days in the Asakusa burlesque scene. According to his autobiography, he encountered no resistance from the press to his request, even receiving applause from the reporters at the time of the announcement, who were already aware of her background. Also, he has three children with her, who were not introduced to the press for some time since they led private lives. In his 2007 autobiography he finally introduced their names publicly.

=== Other ===
- He is listed as a top-ten owner in the prominent television production company TV Man Union. As the first independent Japanese production company, Hagimoto supported it with an investment.
- Aside from baseball, he was active as a racehorse owner, including Ogura Memorial winner Anburasumoa (Hagimoto Kikaku), Biyorurinku, and an entry into the 1977 Nihon Derby.
- He is a fan of shogi, and officially ranked by the Nihon Shogi Renmei (Japan Shogi Association). On a 2006 New Year's program he teamed with 9th dan pro Toshiyuki Moriuchi to win a doubles match.
- When someone comes asking for an apprenticeship, he takes them to eat. This is to observe how they hold their chopsticks. He explained, "The ability to hold chopsticks properly is proof that they were able to accept their parent's disciplining, which is a necessary attitude for development".
- He doesn't like ice cream. He worked at a cafe as a youngster, was forced to eat the remaining unsold ice cream, and hasn't been interested in it since.
- He wrote in his book, "I hate miniskirts". He is known to request female cast members on his shows to avoid wearing miniskirts.
- On 24-Jikan Terebi 'Ai wa Chikyu wo Suku, broadcast on August 18–19, 2007, he participated as the charity marathon runner. Considering his age of 66 years, he chose a distance of 70 km (rather than the usual 100 km) which was considered to be possible in 24 hours even if walked. He still had 900m remaining when time ran out in the broadcast at 20:52:30, but his finish was shown in the next time slot (Gyoretsu no Dekiru Horitsu Sodansho). Viewer ratings peaked at 42.9% at the finishing moment, with an average of 35%. Always liking to stick to the script, he was disappointed at failing to finish inside the scheduled program time.

== Influence ==
His influence on the entertainment and broadcast worlds can still be felt, with stars who started under him such as Tsutomu Sekine, Kazuki Kosakai, Emi Hashino, Toshirō Yanagiba, and Kunikazu Katsumata still appearing on television, radio, and stage, along with scriptwriters like Ryoichi Kimizuka and Shousuke Oiwa. He also helped the then unknown Dauntaun ("Downtown") comedic duo by giving them appearances on his shows. Though of completely opposite style, they felt a huge obligation to him, with Dauntaun's Masatoshi Hamada once telling the staff of a radio program "get rid of the Hagimoto insults" when handed a script that included jokes about Hagimoto. Dauntaun's Hitoshi Matsumoto recalled his appreciation for him in a book that looking back at the early times when the "Taisho" gave Dauntaun freedom to decide on the content of their act (while keeping a short leash on others).

Around that time he was thrilled to discover the "once in a decade" talents of Jimi Onishi. However, after meeting with him in the dressing room, he dejectedly commented "[the act] was all just 'tennen' (natural)" (mindless foolishness rather than calculated comedic genius). This is said to be the origin of the term "tennen boke" ("natural fool").

The game "yakyuken" in which the players play "jan ken pon" (rock-paper-scissors) while dancing to music and the loser takes off a piece of clothing, became well known after appearing on "Urabangumi wo buttobase!". However, Hagimoto apparently hated it at the time. One reason was its dirtiness, and also the fact that comedic talents of the performers took a backseat to the game itself. It was said that he felt that comedy culture was degradating due to these acts. However, he took part in a game in 2005 at the birthplace of yakyuken, Matsuyama (where originally clothing was not removed). The "atchi muite hoi" extension of "jan ken pon" is said to have spread nationwide only after its use in Kinchan's spot on "Sutā Tanjō!".

Countless other jokes and material are said to have originated from his programs like "Kin Don!", "Yoi Ko, Warui Ko, Futsu no Ko", and "Kinchan Gekidan".

His signature "Kin-chan Jump" was regularly used as a comedy spot in the Michinoku Pro wrestling promotion, which led to it being popularized in overseas wrestling feds as well.

== Works ==
=== Television (programs he headlined) ===
- Suta tanjo! (1971–1980, host, NTV)
- Shīkuretto butai (1972, TBS)
- Nihon ichi no okasan (1972–1976, host, TBS)
- Oru suta kazoku taiko utagassen (1972–1984, host, Fuji)
- Shabon tamabonbon (1973, NTV)
- Kinchan no don! to yatte miyo (1975-1980 (Saturdays), 1981-1986 (Mondays), Fuji)
- Kinchan no doko made yaru no!? (1976–1986, TV Asahi)
- 24-jikan terebi "ai wa chikyu wo Suku" (1978-1984 as star, 1986-1989 as cast member, 2007 as 70 km marathon runner, NTV)
- Kinchan dorama - OH! kaidan kazoku!! (1979, NTV)
- Kinchan gekijo - torikaji ippa-i (1979, NTV)
- Kinchan & Katori Shingo no zen-nihon kasou taisho (1979, NTV)
- Kinchan no 9-ji terebi (1980–1981, Fuji)
- Kinchan no shukan Kin-yobi (1982–1985, TBS)
- Tamichan (dorama, 1984, TV Asahi)
- Nichiyobi ku-ji wa asobi-za desu (NTV)
- TV purebakku (1985–1989, host, Fuji)
- Dokido Kin-chan supirittsu (1986, TBS)
- Kin-chan no kiraku ni rin (1988, NTV)
- Kin-kira rin 530! (1988, NTV)
- Kin-chan no doko made warau no?! -> Kin doko TV!! (1988, TV Asahi)
- Kin-chan hashiru! (1991, Fuji)
- Yo! taisho mikke (1994–1995, Fuji)
- Renzoku terebi shosetsu himawari (1996 NHK) narrator/voice of Minamita family dog "Riki"
- Kin-chan to minna-de shabette waratte (1998–2002, NHK)

=== Radio ===
- Dochira-sama mo Kin-chan desu (1971–1972, Nippon Hōsō)
- Kin-chan no don to itte miyō (1972–1979, Nippon Hōsō)
- Rajio chariti myujikkuson (as a personality 1975-1985, Nippon Hōsō networks)
- Kinchan no koko kara tokoton (1979–1980, Nippon Hōsō)
- Nyusu waido Kin-chan no moppara no hyoban (1987–1988, Nippon Hōsō)

=== Animation ===
- Wallace and Gromit (voice of Wallace)

=== Film ===
- Te (1969)
- Ore wa nemutakatta!! (1970 Shōchiku)
- The Bad News Bears Go to Japan (1978)
- Dai 1-kai Kin-chan no shinemajakku (1993)
- Dai 2-kai Kin-chan no shinemajakku (1994)
- Tatchi (2005)
- Woresu to gurumitto yasai hatake de dai pinchi! (voice actor 2006)

=== Games ===
- Jikkyo powerful pro yakyū 12 (accompanied by the Golden Golds)

== Authored works ==
- Kin-chan tsunnomeri
- Kin-chan no ha nikami ningengaku - doshite ore-tte baka nan-daro
- Kin-chan doko made kaku no
- Kin-chan no ai no sekai 45 - ichi-nichi ichigo de shiawase-zukuri
- Totte oki ju-wa
- Terebi ni koi shite 20-nen
- "Warai" hodo suteki-na shobai wa nai
- Mada un wa aru ka
- Kaiwajutsu—dare to demo kokoro ga kayo nihongo no shaberikata
- Kin-chan no jinsei konto da yo!!
- Jinsei ni wa chansu ga san-do aru—seiko suru hito no enshutsuryoku
- Yumoa de ikou!
- Nande soo naru no! --hagimoto kinichi ichi jiden
- Kin genryoku

== "Pajama-To" ==
The "Pajama-To" is the writing team behind some of Kinichi Hagimoto's hit programs like "Kin don!". Within the team the trio of Tsuruma, Ōkura, and Kimizuka are known as the "Sarada-To". Hagimoto himself also contributed under the pen name "Fusashi Aki".

- Shousuke Oiwa
- Toshiharu Okura
- Jun Nagai
- Hiroshi Shimura
- Shunji Suzuki
- Masayuki Tsuruma
- Tsuyoshi Masuko
- Ryōichi Kimizuka (later worked on scripts for Zutto anata ga suki datta and Bayside Shakedown)
