= Tsutomu Sekine =

Japanese comedian, television presenter and owarai tarento

- 関根 勤
- Born: 21 August 1953 (age 72); Minato, Tokyo, Japan
- Other names: Rabbie (ラビー, Rabī)
- Education: Nihon University
- Occupations: Comedian; television presenter
- Years active: 1974–
- Agent: Asaikikaku
- Notable work: Kosakin De Wow!
- Style: Conte; monomane
- Television: Current; Mirai Monster; Pet no Ōkoku: One da Land; Former; Kakklakin Dai Hōsō!!; Kinchan no doko made yaru no!?; Waratte Iitomo!; Sanma no Super Karakuri TV
- Height: 168 cm (5 ft 6 in)
- Partner: Kazuki Kosakai
- Children: Mari Sekine (eldest daughter); K (son-in-law; married to Mari)
- Awards: 21st Best Father Yellow Ribbon Award Entertainment Division (2002)

Notes
- Same year/generation as: Sanma Akashiya; All Hanshin-Kyojin; Shinsuke Shimada

Tsutomu Sekine (関根 勤, Sekine Tsutomu; born 21 August 1953, in Minato, Tokyo) is a Japanese comedian, singer and television presenter. His former stage name is Rabbit Sekine (ラビット関根, Rabitto Sekine). He is represented with Asai Kikaku. His daughter is tarento Mari Sekine.

Sekine is partnered with Kazuki Kosakai, who is a junior at his talent agency and also a longtime best friend, in a comedy duo called Kosakin.

== Filmography ==
=== TV programmes ===
Current appearances

Year	Title	Network	Notes	Ref.
2003	Ameagari Ketsushitai no Talk Bangumi Ame-talk!	TV Asahi	Occasional appearances	
2012	PythagoraSwitch	NHK-E	"Konna koto dekimasen" corner	
2013	Sport!	Fuji TV	"Tsutomu Sekine no Yumemiru Sport!" corner presenter	
2014	Mirai Monster	Fuji TV		
2014	Hakkutsu! Break Neta Geinin! Geinin!! Geinin!!!	Bee TV		
2014	Pet no Ōkoku: One da Land	ABC	Regular MC	
	Cream Quiz Miracle 9	TV Asahi	Occasional appearances	
2016	Shiawase ga Ichiban	Fuji TV, BS Fuji	Narration	
2016	Tsutomu Sekine Kaden no Fukai Yoru	BS11	Bar 11 owner	
2016	Tokyo Crasso! Neo	Tokyo MX		
2016	Kosakin no Radio gokko	Mondo TV	MC	
2016	Shōwa Kayō Best Ten	BS-TBS	MC	

Specials

Year	Title	Network	Notes
1994	Sanma Tamao no Otoshidama anta no Yume o kanaetaro ka Special	TBS	Broadcasts every January
2004	Sekine & Yūka no Warau Series	TV Asahi	
2004	Tonneruzu no Minasan no Okage deshita	Fuji TV	"Hakase to Joshu: Komaka sugite Tsutawaranai Monomane Senshuken" corner regular (Daihakushi)
2009	Monomane Grand Prix	NTV	Regular Jury / Jury Chairperson
	HoriKen fureai Tabi: Ningentteīna	TV Asahi	
2014	Kosakin Amami no Chō Hakkutsu! Monomane Variety Mane mono	Fuji TV	

==== Internet TV ====
Year	Title	Website
2016	#Nade mawasu TV Tsutomu Sekine ga Nicchina Are o nade mawasu	Abema TV

Former appearances
Regular appearances and one-off specials only
NHK · NHK-BS

Year	Title	Notes
1995	Owarai Dunk Shoot	
1995	Hotch Potch Station	
1999	Mane shite Mane sa re Futaritabi	Co-starred with Hideji Ōtaki
2007	58th NHK Kōhaku Uta Gassen	As a Kōhaku cheer member with captain Mari Sekine
2010	Deep People	
2012	Katsura Bunshi no subete: Katsura Fumie VI Shūmei	
2015	Kōkō Yakyū 100-Nen no monogatari ano Kandō Scene o Nekkyū Talk!	Co-presented with NHK Announcer Tomomi Hirose

Nippon TV

Year	Title	Notes	Ref.
	Kinyō 10-ji! Uwasa no Channel!!		
	Kakklakin Dai Hōsō!!		
1979	Zoom In!! Asa!	Han-nenkan Machikado reporter	
1981	Star Tanjō!	Kyu Sakamoto-presented era	
1982	5-Ji Sat Magazine	Second presenter	
1987	11 PM	Wednesday and Friday presenter	
1987	Kosakin Katte ni go kko		
	Dochirasama mo!! Emi tte Yoroshiku	In thirty minutes, non-periodical appearances in five frames at a rate of once every two months	
	Quiz Sekai wa Show by!!	Quasi-regular solver	
1992	Hyu Hyu		
1994	Sokuseki! Akarui Kaizō Keikaku		
1997	Tomosa ka Keno Yūutsu		
1998	Gyu! To dakishimetai!		
1999	Pikaichi		
2001	Japan Walker		
2002	Saikyō Damashī		
2005	Cream Stew no tarira Relan		
2014	Zip!	Thursday commentator	

Tokyo Broadcasting System

Year	Title	Notes
	Ginza Now!	"Shirōto Comedian Dōjō" first champion
1979	Quiz Ressha Shuppatsu Shinkō	
1987	Papa Daisuki!	
1992	Sanma no Karakuri TV	
	Wakuwaku Dōbutsu Land	
1993	Ocha no ko Saisai	
1993	Kosakinrū no Okonnaide Kiite!!	
1994	Jungle TV: Tamori no Hōsoku	
1996	Sanma no Super Karakuri TV	
1996	Ōsama no Brunch	Regular
1999	Chance no Dendō	
2003	Bakushō Mondai no Baku Ten!	Regular

Fuji Television · BS Fuji

Year	Title	Notes	Ref.
1984	Kokoro wa Lonely Kimochi wa "..."		
1985	Waratte Iitomo!	Regular	
1985	Ore-tachi Hyōkin-zoku	Semi-regular (late programme)	
1989	Kuni-chan no Yamada katsute nai TV		
1989	Quiz! Hayaku itte yo		
	Tamori-Takeshi-Sanma Big 3 Seiki no Golf Match	Narrator (except the 3rd and 6th)	
1992	Sekine & Lou no! Quiz Success		
1994	Quiz! Toshi no Sa nante	Adult Team solver	
1994	TV Cruise: Tonari no Papaya	Thursday caster	
1994	Yo! Taishō mi kke		
1995	Entame Yūenchi: Tokyo Ijū Keikaku		
1997	Unbelievable		
1999	Akashiya Mansion Monogatari	"Kramer Kramer" as Tsutomu-kun	
2000	100% Kyaeen!		
2001	Fight Money		
2001	Akashiya Ukenen Monogatari		
2001	Sugo Ude! Bout		
2002	The Letters: Kazoku no Ai ni arigatō		
2002	Moshimo Tours		
2004	Lion no gokigenyō	Kazuki Kosakai's substitute due to resting in illness	
2005	Tamori no Japonica Logos		
2005	100 Hitome no Baka		
2006	Hitoshi Matsumoto no suberanai Hanashi	Episodes 8 and 10	
2008	Tsutomu Sekine 5 Minutes Performance		
2008	Ikkakusenkin! Nihon Rou Rettō	Quasi-regular	
2008	Be Ponkikki	"Tobe BB!" Si-Sensei	
2009	Honne no Dendō!! Shinsuke ni hawa karumai	Regular	
2014	Kosakin Dōchū: Bura bbura bbura'!		
2015	Shōjiki sanpo	Mari's substitute due to maternity leave	

TV Asahi

Year	Title	Notes
	13-Ji Show	"Flash Quiz" presenter
1976	Tetsuko no Heya	"Flash Quiz"
1980	Tamori Club	
	Kinchan no doko made yaru no!?	
1986	Sanma no Gomen ne wagamama de	
	Pao-Pao Channel	Second Monday chairperson
1993	Sanma no Nan demo Derby	
1995	Kibun wa Wild: Tobidase Dai Shizen e	
1996	Chō Jigen Time Bomber	Quasi-regular
	Ring no Tamashī	
2008	The Quiz Man	
	Ima sugu Tsukaeru Mame Chishiki: Quiz Zatsugaku-ō	
2009	Galileo Hit Nō-ken	
2010	Kosakin De Radio!	

TV Tokyo

Year	Title	Notes
1982	Emi tte Lunrun	As Rabbit Sekine (but Sekine himself was removed three times) who was co-presented with Monta Mino. Despite aired at the Golden Time, it was cancelled after eight episodes due to low viewing rates.
1988	Oh! Kitchen Kazoku	
1989	Yume-dōri Apron-tei	
1996	Shitte Doo suru no!?	
2003	Ura Sekine TV	
2007	Ochanoma no Shinjitsu: Moshikashite Watashidake!?	Quasi-regular
2009	The Gyakuryū Researchers	
2010	Gyakuryū! Shi Label Travel	
2011	Gyōten Quiz! Chin Rule Show	Regular panelist

Japanese Association of Independent Television Stations

Year	Title	Network	Notes
2007	Suzuki	tvk	"Nioi-bu" director

Broadcasting and communications satellite

Year	Title	Network	Ref.
2010	Tsutomu Sekine: Eiga no Jikan	Star Channel	
2012	Eiga-chan	Channel Neco	
2015	Oshiete! Kaden no Kamisama	BS11	

=== Radio ===
Current appearances

Year	Title	Network
2011	Tsutomu Sekine no Supopara	NCB
2015	Kusukusu	Bay FM

Former appearances

Year	Title	Network	Notes
	Tsutomu Sekine no One-Two Punch!	TBS Radio, JRN	
1981	Kosakin De Wow!	TBS Radio, JRN	
1986	Tsutomu Sekine no Tokyo Best Hit	NBS	Main personality
1991	Zenkoku Kayō Best Ten	NCB	Personality
2007	Ore-tachi Mōsozoku: Tsutomu Sekine no Atama no Naka	JFNC	
2009	Tsutomu Sekine no Kankonkin Radio: Poān to Kii te ne!!	NCB	
2013	Tsutomu Sekine no Lunch de Genki!	NBS	
2014	Radio de Anshin: Minna no Bōsai 2014	NBS	Main personality

=== TV dramas ===
Year	Title	Role	Network	Notes
1976	Tanuki Sensei Sōdō-ki		Fuji TV	
1976	Himitsu Sentai Gorenger	Truck driver	TV Asahi	Episode 57
1977	Zenryaku Ofukuro-sama		NTV	Series 2 Episode 14
1978	Ponkotsu Robot Taihei-ki		NHK	
1979	Akuryō no Sumu Yakata		KTV	
1980	Shin Edo no Senpū	Umekichi	Fuji TV	Episode 16
1980	Tadaima Hōkago	Komaki Oga	Fuji TV	
1981	Tamanegi muitara...	Tadahiro Kawakami	TBS	Episodes 9, 13, 27
1981	Keiji Inu Curl 2	Osawa	TBS	
1981	Adauchi Senshu		Fuji TV	
1982	Onihei Hanka-chō		TV Asahi	Series 3 Episode 4
1987	Ore no Musuko wa Genkijirushi		NTV	
1987	Human Crossing		TBS	
1987	Akireta Keiji	Ken Ishida	NTV	
1988	Tsūkai! Rock'n Roll-dōri	Ryuji Kurosawa	TBS	
1989	Imasara, Hatsukoi	Ryo Tasaki	TBS	
1990	Joshidai-sei Kiken na Arubaito: Sumikomi Kateikyōshi-hen		TBS	
1990	Yonimo Kimyōna Monogatari: Shitai kusai	Naoto Hishi	Fuji TV	
1992	Yonimo Kimyōna Monogatari: Oyaji		Fuji TV	
1992	Tokugawa Buraichō	Yagyū Jūbei Mitsuyoshi	TV Tokyo	Episode 16
2003	Kokoro wa Lonely Kimochi wa "...." XI		NTV	
2014	Senryoku-gai Sōsa-kan	Shinjuro Kaneshiro	NTV	
2014	Ressha Sentai ToQger	Conductor	TV Asahi	
2014	Ressha Sentai ToQger vs. Kamen Rider Gaim: Spring Break Combined Special	Conductor	TV Asahi	
2019	Natsuzora		NHK	Asadora

=== Films ===
Year	Title	Role	Notes
1975	Track Yarō Bakusō Ichibanhoshi	Vacuum Car Assistant Taro Horikoma	
1981	Blue Jeans Memory	Tsuji Hisashi	
1981	Something Like It	Kawazoe	Kazuki Kosakai and Okama combination
1986	Onyan-ko The Movie: Kiki Ippatsu!	Ace of spades	
1987	Sotsugyō Proof	Professor Kei Kito	
1989	The Toxic Avenger Part II	Newscaster	
1989	Erik the Viking	Slave Driver	
1994	Hero Interview	Professor Yamamoto	
1997	Crayon Shin-chan: Pursuit of the Balls of Darkness	Nansan	As a member of Kosakin (not credited)
2001	Crayon Shin-chan: The Storm Called: The Adult Empire Strikes Back	TV voice	As a member of Kosakin
2014	Ressha Sentai ToQger the Movie: Galaxy Line S.O.S.	Conductor	
2014	Ressha Sentai ToQger vs. Kyoryuger: The Movie	Conductor	
2015	Shinjuku Swan		
2015	All Esper Dayo!	Tasche Boy	Cameo

=== Direct-to-video · narration ===
Direct-to-video

Year	Title	Role
1991	Kekko Kamen	
1991	2-Ri no Magical Night	
2015	They Went and Came Back Again Ressha Sentai ToQGer: Super ToQ 7gou of Dreams	Former conductor / ToQ 7gou

Narration

Title	Notes
TDK Hakken no Mori Series: Tsutomu Sekine no-san sū Mekimeki Tour	Voice of Harwie

=== Stage/events ===
Year	Title	Notes
1984	Kaiten Ebi Kazoku	9th anniversary entertainment life performance
1985	Kozakai-kun no o sumashi de Show	From 1st to 5th
1989	Kankonkin Theater	Unification of subtitles from the 6th performance Kudoi!
	K-1 World GP Series	Ring announcer
	Japan Academy Prize	33, 34, 35 times award ceremony presenter

=== Advertisements ===
Current

Year	Title
2009	Rohto Pharmaceutical Mentholatum AD series
2010	Rohto Pharmaceutical Pansiron
2010	Meganesuper
2010	Ito-Yokado
2011	Rohto Pharmaceutical Rothgold 40
2013	Jidōsha Seibi Shinkō-kai Kantō Block Renraku Kyōgi-kai

Former

Year	Title	Notes
	New Japan Kanko	
	Cow Brand Soap Kyoshinsha One Day Shampoo & Rinse	
	Epoch Co. Barcode Battler	
	Marunaga Confectionery Alps Mate	
1989	Procter & Gamble Vix Vapor Bath	Kyushu Limited
1995	Hitachi Flora	Co-starred with Shigeo Nagashima
1995	The Sumitomo Bank	Voice of Bankoo
2001	Aderans	As Manager Shigeo Shimao
2003	Nintendo Mario Golf Family Tour	
	Lion Corporation Look series	
	Eiden	Tōkai region only
	Yakult Honsha Softor LCS 100	
	SRI Sports (now Dunlop Sports) Golf Ball Miracle Everio	
2007	Suntoryfoods Vitamin Water "Monomane Chiba"	Co-starred with Mokomichi Hayami
2007	Ōtsuka Chirudo Shokuhin Sugoi Kuro Dice	
2008	Toyota "Eco Kae" Campaign	
2009	S. T. Shōshū Plug	

== Discography/Bibliography ==
=== CD ===
Year	Title	Notes
1991	"Latin no Gotoku / Psychedelic Sound Paradise"	As Oracellal, with Lou Oshiba and Lucky Ikeda
1993	"True"	As Yonemitsu Club, with Miho Yonemitsu (Tokyo Performance Doll) and Hikaru Ijūin
1994	"Talk Mance 'Otoko no tame no Onna Dai Sakusen"	

=== VHS · DVD ===
Year	Title	Notes
1994	Kamakiri Densetsu <Tsutomu Sekine> Kari	
2004	Tsutomu Sekine Kamakiri Densetsu 2	
2006	Tsutomu Sekine Cream Stew Presents!! CG nanka de Owarai o Mezashi chau Hito no tame no Keikō to Taisaku	
2007	Otōsan	
2008	Tsutomu Sekine Kamakiri Densetsu: Kudoi!	
2008	Nō kakutō-ka: Tsutomu Sekine no Mōsōdjikara Series	
2009	Tsutomu Sekine 5 Minutes Performance 2 Kankonkin Theater Kessei 20-shūnen Toppa Kinen Sakuhin "Kudoi!"	
2013	Mikakunin Chūgakusei X	Music video director
2014	Dynamite Kansai 2014	Special round guest

=== Books ===
Year	Title	Notes	Code
1985	Kazuki Kosakai Tsutomi Sekine no Shakai-gaku ― Better Choice Life no susume		ISBN 978-4789701983
1995	Tsutomu Sekine no Submission Eigakan		ISBN 978-4390604062
1997	Tsuromu Sekine no Full Contact Eigakan		ISBN 978-4594022303
1997	Tsutomu Sekine Heisei Kakutō-ō Retsuden		ISBN 978-4796204682
1999	Tsutomu Sekine no yaru dake Male mōke! !	Golf book	ISBN 978-4575290301
2001	Maeda Sekine no oshaberi ni Aitakute ― sha Belist Yōsei Kōza	Co-authored with Takehiko Maeda	ISBN 978-4907710774
2003	Tsutomu Sekine×Kijun Edo Cinema Jū-ban Shōbu		ISBN 978-4829175361
2004	Ura Sekine Hon		ISBN 978-4872338324
2005	Baka Positive		ISBN 978-4838714766; ISBN 978-4863320451 (new edition)
2009	Mōsōdjikara	Co-authored with Ken Mogi	ISBN 978-4796669238
2011	Tsutomu Sekine no Ningen Kansatsu		ISBN 978-4537258714
2012	Zen Kōtei! Sekine-ryū Positive Jinsei Sōdan		ISBN 978-4838724574

=== Films ===
Year	Title	Notes	Ref.
2015	Sōon	Director	

== Impression repertoire ==
- Sonny Chiba
- Hideji Ōtaki
- Koichi Wajima
- Isao Aoki
- Giant Baba
- Shigeo Nagashima

== Related works ==
- Ichiro Yamanaka
  - Tsutomu Sekine noTensaina noda. (March 1997, Fūjin-sha) ISBN 978-4938733339
  - Tsutomu Sekine-Lou Oshiba 100-Sai no Chōsen (December 2004, Īzuka Shoten) ISBN 978-4752260035
- 2003 Īno Kenji Taidan-shū (1999, Sony Magazines) ISBN 978-4789713597
