= Take Off (2PM song) =

- Regular edition cover

Single by 2PM

from the album Republic of 2PM
- B-side: "Heartbeat (Japanese ver.)"
- Released: May 18, 2011 (Japan)
- Recorded: 2011
- Genre: J-pop; Dance-pop
- Length: 3:23
- Label: Ariola Japan
- Composers: J.Y. Park; Super Changddai; Akihito Tanaka
- Lyricists: J.Y. Park; Kenn Kato; KOMU
- Producers: J.Y. Park; Super Changddai; Akihito Tanaka

2PM singles chronology
"I'll Be Back" (2010)	"Take Off" (2011)	"Hands Up" (2011)

Music video
- "Take Off" on YouTube

"Take Off" is the debut Japanese single by South Korean boy band 2PM, released on May 18, 2011. Prior to its release, the song was used as the ending song theme for the first 12 episodes of the first season of the Blue Exorcist anime series. "Take Off" set a new record for the highest first-week sales of a debut Japanese single by a Korean group.

== Background ==
2PM had previously entered the Japanese market with several releases of their Korean music in the country, including their first studio album, 01:59PM. On December 8, 2010, the group made their debut live performances in Japan titled 2PM 1st Contact in Japan, which saw a total audience of 25,000 fans. On March 5, 2011, the group announced their debut Japanese single, "Take Off" at the 12th Tokyo Girls Collection.

Prior to the single's official release, "Take Off" was used as the ending song theme for the first 12 episodes of the first season of the Blue Exorcist anime series, which began airing on April 17, 2011. The song quickly topped various Japanese music charts, becoming the first debut song by a Korean artist to top the USEN J-pop Chart. A teaser video for the song's music video was also released on 2PM's official Japanese website.

The song was first performed live at the group's first concert tour in Japan, also named Take Off, which took place from May 6 to May 13, 2011.

== Composition and music video ==
"Take Off" is an upbeat pop song about falling in love and the start of a relationship. The song was purposely chosen to contrast with 2PM's recent releases in South Korea, which tended to focus on their "beast idol" image and be more moody and grittier than "refreshing". These "localization changes" also extended to the group's image in the music video, in which the group wears white outfits in a bright and futuristic spaceship-like set, in contrast to their recent Korean music videos, in which the group tended to wear darker clothes that accentuated their muscular physiques. The flight-themed choreography of the song features a dance move in which the arms are spread out to mimic an airplane.

The single's B-side is a Japanese version of their Korean song "Heartbeat", the lead single of their first Korean album 01:59PM. A ringtone version of the track was released on April 25, 2011.

== Commercial performance ==
"Take Off" was released on May 18, 2011. The song debuted at number 4 on the Oricon Singles Chart with a first-week sales total of over 59,000 copies, surpassing Girls' Generation's "Genie" to set a new record for the highest first-week sales of a debut single by a Korean group. It charted on the Oricon Singles Chart for a total of 17 weeks.

== Promotion ==
In promotion of the release, a 2PM-themed pop-up cafe, store, and panel exhibition opened in Shibuya, Tokyo. The group also made various appearances on Japanese television, such as the May 20 episode of Fuji TV's Waratte Iitomo! and the May 22 episode of NHK's Music Japan. On May 21, 2011, the group held their first "Hi Touch" fan event at Pacifico Yokohama, which saw an attendance of 40,000 fans.

On January 26, 2015, a Japanese free-to-play mobile simulation game with microtransactions titled 2PM Take Off & Story launched via I-SKY for IOS and Android systems, named after the group's debut single. The player plays as the manager of 2PM's dormitory, living and bonding with the members and playing mini-games to earn digital idol cards. Services for the game were shut down in 2022.

== Track listing ==
CD+DVD and CD-only track listing
No.	Title	Lyrics	Music	Arranger	Length
1.	"Take Off"	J.Y. Park; Kenn Kato; KOMU	J.Y. Park; Super Changddai; Akihito Tanaka	J.Y. Park "The Asiansoul"; Super Changddai; Akihito Tanaka	3:23
2.	"Heartbeat" (Japanese ver.)	J.Y. Park; Yu Shimoji; Shoko Fujibayashi; KOMU	J.Y. Park	The Asiansoul; Rainstone	3:16
3.	"Take Off" (without main vocal)		J.Y. Park; Super Changddai; Akihito Tanaka	J.Y. Park; Super Changddai; Akihito Tanaka	3:24
4.	"Heartbeat" (Japanese ver.) (without main vocal)		J.Y. Park	The Asiansoul; Rainstone	3:14
Total length:					13:17

CD-only limited pressing track listing
No.	Title	Lyrics	Music	Arranger	Length
1.	"Take Off"	J.Y. Park; Kenn Kato; KOMU	J.Y. Park; Super Changddai; Akihito Tanaka	J.Y. Park "The Asiansoul"; Super Changddai; Akihito Tanaka	3:23
2.	"Heartbeat" (Japanese ver.)	J.Y. Park; Yu Shimoji; Shoko Fujibayashi; KOMU	J.Y. Park	The Asiansoul; Rainstone	3:16
3.	"Take Off" (TV size ver.)				1:35
4.	"Take Off" (without main vocal)				3:24
5.	"Heartbeat" (Japanese ver.) (without main vocal)				3:14
6.	"Take Off" (TV size ver.) (without main vocal)				1:34
Total length:					16:26

DVD
No.	Title	Length
1.	"Take Off" (music video)
2.	"Take Off" (music video - dance version)

== Charts ==
=== Oricon ===
Oricon Chart	Peak	Debut sales	Sales total	Ref.
Daily Singles Chart	3	59,059	73,210	
Weekly Singles Chart	4	59,059	73,210	
Monthly Singles Chart	11	59,059	73,210	
Yearly Singles Chart	104	59,059	73,210	

=== Other ===
Chart	Peak	Ref.
Japan (Billboard Japan Hot 100)	3	
Japan (Billboard Japan Hot Animation)	1	
Japan (RIAJ Digital Track)	16	
