= Ami Inamura =

Japanese pin-up model (born 1996)

- 稲村 亜美
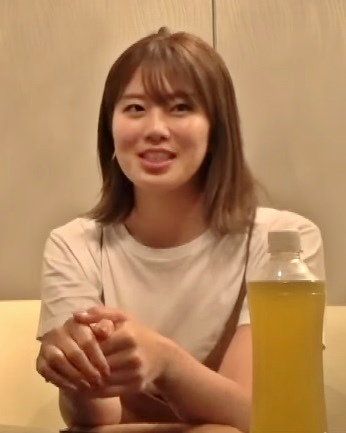
- Born: January 13, 1996 (age 30); Tokyo, Japan
- Education: Hiji High School; Kokushikan University
- Occupations: Gravure idol; tarento; sportscaster
- Years active: 2012–
- Agent: Asaikikaku
- Awards: Miss iD Quasi Grand Prix

Ami Inamura (稲村 亜美, Inamura Ami; born January 13, 1996, in Tokyo, Japan) is a Japanese gravure idol, tarento, and sportscaster represented by Asai Kikaku.

== Filmography ==
=== TV series ===
==== Variety and informative programs ====
Year	Title	Network	Notes	Ref.
2013	Zenryoku-saka	TV Asahi		
2013	Bakushō Dai Nihon Akan Keisatsu	Fuji TV		
2015	Minna no News	Fuji TV		
2015	Honoo-no Taiiku-kai TV	TBS		
2015	Sasuhara Kaiwaizu	Fuji TV		
2015	Vs Arashi	Fuji TV		
2015	Dream Series	Fuji TV One		
2015	Ariyoshi no Nippon Genki Project Oi! Hiro Iki-mura	Fuji TV		
2015	Masahiro Nakai no Pro-yagu Chin Purē kō Purē Taishō	Fuji TV		
2015	Unbelievable	Fuji TV		
2016	Channel Nama Kaiten All Zap!	BS Sky PerfecTV		
2016	Professional Baseball News	Fuji TV One	Friday MC; Regular appearances	
2016	Golf no Shinzui	TV Tokyo	Regular appearances	
2016	World Sports MLB Special	NHK BS1		
2016	Kiyoshi Nakahata no Nekketsu Sports Ōen-dan	BS11	Regular appearances	
2016	World Baseball Entertainment Tamatchi!	Fuji TV		
2016	Tokyo Ōen Sengen	TV Asahi		
2016	Ichioshi!	HTB		
2017	Kunoichi	TBS		

==== Dramas ====
Year	Title	Role	Network	Notes	Ref.
	Hirugao: Heijitsu Gogo 3-ji no Koibito-tachi	Student	Fuji TV		
2015	Hatsumori Bemars	Ami Suigyoku	TV Tokyo	Episode 5	

=== Radio series ===
Year	Title	Network	Notes
2015	MBS Baseball Park	MBS Radio	
2015	Tsutomu Sekine no Supopara	NCB	Regular appearances
2016	Pete no Fushigina Garage	Tokyo FM	Episode 159

=== Internet ===
==== Programs ====
Year	Title	Network	Notes
2015	Hanaseru Sports News Supowochi	Niconico Live	
2015	Kazuhisa Ishii no Reirei Shite Mita	Niconico Live	
2015	Onegai! Ranking-sei	TV Asahi	
2015	All Night Nippon w	NBS	

==== Articles ====
Year	Title	Notes
2015	Tokyo Lucci	
2016	Shū Pre-net	

==== E-books ====
Year	Title	Notes
2015	Digital Shū Pre Shashin-shū	

==== Game apps ====
Year	Title	Notes
2016	Pro Yagu Royal	Event reporter
