= Kasou Taishou =

Japanese television series

- Also known as: Masquerade; ALL JAPAN KASOH GRAND-PRIX
- Presented by: Kinichi Hagimoto (1st-99th editions); Shingo Katori (since 65th edition)
- Country of origin: Japan
- No. of episodes: 101 (Main); 1 (Special)

Production
- Running time: 2-3 hours
- Production company: Nippon Television

Original release
- Network: NNS (NTV)
- Release: December 31, 1979 – present

Kasou Taishou (欽ちゃん＆香取慎吾の全日本仮装大賞, Kinchan ando Katori Shingo no Zen Nihon Kasō Taishō; All Japan Kasou (costume) Grand Prix, internationally known as Masquerade) is a semi-annual Japanese television variety show that is run on Nippon TV and first aired in 1979.

The program shows various amateur groups (or solo artists) performing short skits, which are rated by a panel of judges. Especially in recent years, many of the skits have revolved around clever methods of "faking" cinematic special effects on a live stage. The show is hosted by Kinichi Hagimoto and Shingo Katori. Worldwide, the most famous of these skits, and among the most successful at "fake special effects" was a skit which is widely known as "Matrix ping pong".

On the 98th edition (February 6, 2021) of the program, Kinichi Hagimoto announced that this would be the last time that he will present the program. However, he ended up returning in the 99th edition (2023).

In 2025, The show had a Special edition called Kasou Taishou Grand Champion in Expo which aired on May 26, 2025. It was recorded at Expo 2025. With foreigners such as American, Australian, Indian, Chilean, Malian, Jordanian, and Dutch watching and voting each shows, Including an English narrator who speaks the shows title in English.

== Matrix ping pong ==
Matrix Ping Pong is a popular movie clip from the show featuring performers playing ping pong with moves in the style of The Matrix, using kurokos—stagehands in kabuki theatre—to hold the props up, facilitating humorous and otherwise impossible movements. Most of the elements in the performance are set against black to visibly obscure the stagehands. This performance, led by team captain Hideki Kajiwara (梶原比出樹), won the competition on March 31, 2003. The clip became an internet meme. The Matrix Ping Pong was return appearance in 2025.

Screenshot of the Matrix Ping Pong skit from Kasou Taishou showing the use of black-dressed stagehands for special effects

== International broadcast ==
The show is also aired internationally in some countries. Hong Kong airs this programme under the name of "全民創意爭霸賽" on the i-CABLE Entertainment Channel with Cantonese dubbing, while in Taiwan it was aired under the name "超級變變變". Indonesia, Malaysia and Singapore on the other hand airs it under the name of Masquerade. The Indonesian and Singaporean broadcasts under this title are aired dubbed, on RCTI and MNCTV in Indonesian and MediaCorp okto in English respectively, whereas the Malaysian broadcast on TV3 is aired with Malay subtitles. in Thailand broadcast on Channel 9 MCOT in title named "Game Za Tha Kuen (เกมซ่าท้ากึ๋น)". Southeast Asia also airs it as Masquerade (year) on Sony Gem TV aired every Christmas Day.

In the Philippines, the version of the show airs on GMA Network as part of Bilib Ka Ba Nights (transl. Do You Believe? Nights) block of the network under the name of Masquerade and hosted by Ariel Villasanta and Maverick Relova, it ran from August 20, 2008 until March 11, 2009.

== In other popular culture ==
The show was featured in the music video for the 2004 single "Flamboyant" by British pop-duo Pet Shop Boys. Directed by Nico Beyer, the music video follows one of the real participants of the show that eventually goes on to win the competition with their recreation of billiards.
