= Atsuko Okamoto =

Japanese actress and popular celebrity (born 1973)

- 岡元 あつこ
- Born: 6 October 1973 (age 52); Nagoya, Japan
- Other names: Atchan (あっちゃん)
- Occupations: Actress; Popular celebrity
- Years active: 1989–
- Modeling information
- Height: 163 cm (5 ft 4 in) (2007)

Atsuko Okamoto (岡元 あつこ, 岡元 厚子, Okamaoto Atsuko; born 6 October 1973, in Nagoya) is a Japanese actress and popular celebrity. She is represented by Asai Kikaku.

== Early life and education ==
Okamoto moved to Tokyo at one year old, and graduated from Kichiyoshi Girls High School English Course and later Dokkyo University Law school.

== Major appearing programmes ==
=== Current regular programmes ===
Television

Title	Network	Notes
Act de Atsuko	BBC	Saturdays 00:25–01:20

Radio

Title	Network	Notes
Waga Jinsei ni Kanpai	NHK Radio 1	Presented by Shinya Yamamoto; not weekly

=== Former regular programmes ===
Television

Title	Network	Notes
Tonight 2	EX	
Akashiya Mansion Monogatari	CX	Nicknamed "Basue no 27-sai Okamoto" in Ōbeya corner
Ī ne	TX	
Shutsubotsu! Adomachikku Tengoku	TX	
Wipe Out!	TX	
Yorubijo	Sun TV	
San Tora Kentei	Sun TV	
Dancing Sanma Palace	NTV	
Triple A Gold	NBN	

Radio

Title	Network
Koi Shōten	Radio Osaka
Hot Doyō Wide	NCB
Weekly Countdown Party	Tokyo FM
Monta Mino no Weekend o Tsukamaero	NCB

== Other appearances ==
=== Films ===
Year	Title	Notes
	Satsujin Net	
	Dai Nana Kankai Hōkō: Midori Ozaki no Sagashite	
	Hissatsu 6! Omomizu shisu	Appeared in her real name in kanji
	Nihon Bōryoku Chitai	
	Ladies Max	Appeared in her real name in kanji
	Pro Golfer Kinjiro Oribe	
	Jitsuroku Hit Man - Tsuma Sono Ai	
	Merō -Tsuya ya Ratai Ken-	
	Mama's Attack	
2021	I'll Be Your Ears	
2022	The Setting Sun	

=== TV dramas ===
Date	Title	Role	Network	Notes
3 Sep 2015	Konkatsu Keiji	Rie Fukagawa	YTV	Episode 10

=== Stage ===
Title	Troupe	Notes
	Team Warabe Rimu (now Yankee Stadium 20XX)	stage performance
	Produce Unit Joe Company	stage performance
Friendship		Musical
Tsuki-ba Yaoen	Meiji-za	

=== Advertisements ===
Product
Acecook "Harusame Noodle"
Pachinko 123
Boine Diet

== Works ==
=== Photo albums ===
Date	Title	Photographer	Publisher	ISBN
Jun 1997	Beam		Ongakusenkasha	ISBN 4-87279-002-2
Aug 1998	Yearning		Bunkasha	ISBN 4-8211-2234-0
Dec 1998	Yūwaku		Fusosha Publishing	ISBN 4-594-02601-X
Nov 1999	Atukotic		Takeshobo	ISBN 4-8124-0565-3
Jun 2000	Sugerhill		KSS	ISBN 4-87709-471-7
Oct 2000	surrender		Bauhaus	ISBN 4-89461-197-X
Jun 2002	Saga (sei)		Wanimagazine	ISBN 4-89829-848-6
Feb 2004	Atsuko	Seiichi Nomura	Futabasha	ISBN 4-575-29660-0
	Oppai The Tenmei	Tenmei Kano	Takeshobo	

=== CD ===
Date	Title	Label	Notes
Dec 2003	Your Heart Only	Rued Records	As Sweet 9 Diamonds
	Wrestle Disco Fever DX	Toshiba EMI	

=== DVD ===
Date	Title
	Final Beauty
20 Jan 1999	yu-waku
25 Jul 2002	desire
25 Apr 2004	Beauty & Beast
24 Aug 2005	Panasukaruma

== Personal life ==
Okamoto married former footballer Hiroshige Yanagimoto, who was affiliated with Cerezo Osaka at the time, in July 2005, but divorced in July 2017.
