= Let's Appear Together on No. 55: Definitive Edition! =

Japanese television variety show

Minna de Deyou 55-go Ketteiban! (みんなで出よう55号決定版!, Let's Appear Together on No. 55: Definitive Edition!) was a variety show that aired on TBS Network stations (excluding some) from June 10, 1969, to September 23, 1975. It was broadcast in color. It was sponsored exclusively by Tokuhon Honpo (Suzuki Nihondo = now Tokuhon). The program aired every Tuesday from 7:30 PM to 8:00 PM (Japan Standard Time).

From the mid-1970s, it was often listed in newspaper television listings as 55-go Ketteiban!, and the program itself was later retitled to 55-go Ketteiban!.

== Overview ==
This program featured the comedy duo Konto No. 55, who had previously appeared in the earlier program "Cheetah 55-go," and was broadcast live from public halls across Japan. Similar to programs like "Kazoku Sorotte Utagassen" (Family Singing Contest) broadcast on the same network, this program's production was handled by TBS and its Japan News Network (JNN) affiliates on a rotating basis. (Note: It is unknown whether Nippon Television Network System (NTV) affiliates such as Akita Broadcasting, Yamagata Broadcasting, and Fukui Broadcasting, which also aired the program, participated in the production.) However, because it allowed for replacement with locally produced programs or delayed broadcasts from other networks, some stations aired the program on a time-shifted basis (if a time-shifted station was the production station, TBS and other simultaneous broadcast stations were treated as airing it earlier).

The program was broadly composed of two sections: a comedy segment featuring Konto No. 55, such as the "Red Ninja" skit performed by Jiro Sakagami, and viewer participation segments such as "55-go Kettenban" (a pun on the title), which showcased viewers' shortcomings. A live commercial for Tokuhon was shown between the two segments.

After the program ended, Konto No. 55 also appeared as regular panelists on the subsequent program, "Pittashi Kan-Kan."

== Cast ==
- Kinichi Hagimoto (Konto No. 55)
- Jiro Sakagami (Konto No. 55)
- Dankichi Kuruma (Conte 0-banchi)
- Gan-ta Iwata (Conte 0-banchi)
- Shoji Abe
- Tomi Joji and the Royals

== Broadcasting stations ==
- TBS (producing station): Tuesdays 19:30 - 20:00
- Hokkaido Broadcasting: Tuesdays 19:30 - 20:00 (simultaneous broadcast from April 1975) (Note: Until March 1975, the station broadcast programs produced by Asahi Broadcasting Corporation (such as "Buchō Keiji" and "Proposal Daisakusen") in the same time slot, so it was a delayed broadcast. However, due to the network change in the Kansai region, the Asahi Broadcasting Corporation programs moved to Hokkaido Television Broadcasting, resulting in simultaneous broadcasting.)
- Aomori Television: Tuesdays 19:30 - 20:00
- IBC Iwate Broadcasting: Tuesdays 19:30 - 20:00
- Akita Broadcasting: Tuesdays 19:30 - 20:00 → Tuesdays 19:00 - 19:30
- Yamagata Broadcasting: Tuesdays 19:30 - 20:00 (until December 1969) → Tuesdays 19:00 - 19:30 (from January 1970) → Mondays 19:00 - 19:30 (at the time of its end in September 1975)
- Tohoku Broadcasting: Tuesdays 19:30 - 20:00
- Fukushima Television: Tuesdays 19:30 - 20:00
- Niigata Broadcasting: Tuesdays 19:30 - 20:00
- Shin-etsu Broadcasting: Tuesdays 19:30 - 20:00
- Television Yamanashi: Tuesdays 19:30 - 20:00
- Shizuoka Broadcasting System: Tuesdays 19:30 - 20:00
- Fukui Broadcasting System: Mondays 18:00 - 18:30
- Chubu-Nippon Broadcasting: Mondays 18:00 - 18:30
- Asahi Broadcasting Corporation: Saturdays 18:00 - 18:30 (Note: Due to broadcasting its own self-produced television drama "Buchō Keiji" in the 19:00 - 19:30 time slot on Saturdays, sponsored solely by Osaka Gas, the program "Owarai Atama no Taisō," which was originally in the same time slot, was broadcast on a delayed basis on Tuesdays from 19:30 to 20:00, still solely sponsored by Rohto Pharmaceutical.) (until March 1975)
- Mainichi Broadcasting System: Tuesdays 19:30 - 20:00 (from April 1975)
- San-in Broadcasting System: Tuesdays 19:30 - 20:00 (Note: Television listings from the March 1972 issue of the Shimane Shimbun, and the March 1974 and September 1974 issues of the San-in Chuo Shimbun.)
- RSK Television (Sanyo Broadcasting): Tuesdays 19:30 - 20:00
- Chugoku Broadcasting: Tuesdays 19:30 - 20:00 (Note: The final broadcast during the network realignment period, on March 25, 1975 (March 29, 1975 for Asahi Broadcasting), was produced by Chugoku Broadcasting (Source: Tokyo Broadcasting "TBS 50-Year History," pages 149-150, program guide for March 24-30, 1975. This program has a note indicating "RCC production").)
- Shikoku Broadcasting: Saturdays 19:00 - 19:30
- Nankai Broadcasting: Tuesdays 19:30 - 20:00 (until mid-1974)
- Television Kochi: Tuesdays 19:30 - 20:00 (no broadcast as of 1974)
- RKB Mainichi Broadcasting: Sundays 18:00 - 18:30
- Nagasaki Broadcasting: Wednesdays 18:00 - 18:30
- Kumamoto Broadcasting: Tuesdays 19:30 - 20:00 (until mid-1974)
- Oita Broadcasting: Tuesdays 19:30 - 20:00
- Miyazaki Broadcasting: Tuesdays 19:30 - 20:00 (until mid-1974)
- Minami-Nippon Broadcasting: Tuesdays 19:30 - 20:00 (until mid-1974)
- Ryukyu Broadcasting: Tuesdays 19:30 - 20:00 (until mid-1974)

== Remarks ==
According to Hagimoto, the filming in Okinawa in 1975 (produced by Ryukyu Broadcasting) was hampered by bad weather. He had always been fortunate with the weather during filming, but this time it was unfavorable. He took this as a sign that the program should end and immediately requested to leave the show.
Although TBS and the sponsors tried to persuade him to stay, Hagimoto had sensed the program's impending end, and his decision was irreversible. Ultimately, the program ended. The program that replaced it was Pittashi Kan-Kan.
