= Blue Exorcist season 1 =

First season of the Blue Exorcist anime television series

Blue Exorcist
- Season 1
- First home media volume cover for the season
- No. of episodes: 25

Release
- Original network: MBS, TBS
- Original release: April 17 – October 2, 2011

Season chronology
- Next → S2: Kyoto Saga

Blue Exorcist is an anime television series based on the manga series of the same name by Kazue Kato. The first season is directed by Tensai Okamura and produced by A-1 Pictures. The season aired in Japan on MBS and TBS from April 17 to October 2, 2011. The series was originally scheduled to start airing on April 10, 2011, however due to the 2011 Tōhoku earthquake and tsunami, the series' initial broadcast was delayed by a week. The episodes were simulcast with English subtitles online via Hulu, Anime News Network, and Crunchyroll, starting on April 20, 2011. Aniplex of America released Blue Exorcist on DVD in four sets, starting with the first DVD on October 18, 2011.

Four pieces of theme music are used for the episodes: two opening themes and two ending themes. The opening theme song for the first 12 episodes is "Core Pride" performed by Uverworld, while the opening theme song for the rest of the season onwards is "In My World" performed by Rookiez Is Punk'd. The ending theme song for the first 12 episodes is "Take Off" performed by South Korean boy band 2PM, while the ending theme song for the rest of the season onwards is "Wired Life" performed by Meisa Kuroki.

== Episodes ==
No. overall	No. in season	Title	Directed by	Written by	Storyboarded by	Original release date	English air date
1	1	"The Devil Resides in Human Souls"; Transliteration: "Akuma wa Hito no Kokoro ni Sumu" (Japanese: 悪魔は人の心に棲む)	Tensai Okamura	Ryōta Yamaguchi	Tensai Okamura	April 17, 2011	October 2, 2012
A group of priests are mysteriously burned alive by blue flames during a prayer. As one becomes possessed, he screams "demon" before the sky hues blue. Some time later, a troubled teen named Rin Okumura is nearly hit by a crossbow bolt. After punching a local punk for harming pigeons, he's mocked as being a "demon". At home, Rin is scolded by his foster father, Shiro Fujimoto, for fighting and losing his job. In contrast, his younger twin brother Yukio is preparing to attend the prestigious True Cross Academy to become a doctor. Encouraged by the priests at the monastery where he resides, Rin applies for work at a supermarket. Though strong and fast, his clumsiness causes issues. However, his cooking impresses the manager and he keeps the job. That evening, he sees a girl chasing her scarf, which is revealed to be snagged up by a strange creature. Rin chases the creature through the store, causing chaos and getting him fired. Later, despite Shiro's warnings to stay inside, Rin is provoked by the same punks from earlier and follows them. Their leader, Reiji, mocks his brother Yukio and attempts to burn Rin. Overwhelmed, Rin unleashes mysterious blue flames, terrifying the punks. A demon possesses Reiji and reveals to Rin that he is the son of Satan, sent to retrieve him and bring him back to Gehenna. Shocked by this revaluation, Rin is rescued by Shiro, who exorcises the demon with holy verses.
2	2	"Gehenna Gate"; Transliteration: "Gehena Gēto" (Japanese: 虚無界の門(ゲヘナゲート))	Tadahito Matsubayashi	Ryōta Yamaguchi	Tensai Okamura	April 24, 2011	October 13, 2012
Rin and Shiro flee from attacking demons called ghouls and return to their monastery. Shiro reveals the truth to him: Rin is indeed the son of Satan, and his demon powers were sealed away in a Kurikara sword at birth. Unsheathing the sword will permanently awaken his powers. Despite also being the son of Satan, his brother Yukio didn't inherit Satan's power, however Rin did. Demons breach the monastery, and Shiro locks Rin in the monastery's basement to protect him. Shiro and his fellow priests attempt to defend the church, with Shiro exorcizing Reiji of the demon possessing him, but Satan himself possesses Shiro during an argument with Rin, who breaks out the basement and believes they want him out of their lives because of who is actually is. Satan attempts to drag Rin through the Gate of Gehenna. Shiro, however, briefly regains control of his body and sacrifices himself to save Rin. Devastated, Rin unlocks his demonic powers within the sword and destroys the gate, mourning Shiro's death. Later at Shiro's gravesite, Rin is approached by Mephisto Pheles, head of the True Cross Japan branch and friend of Shiro. Though Mephisto and the Exorcists with him initially plan on killing Rin for being Satan's son, Rin refuses to die or flee. Instead, he demands to become an Exorcist so that he can defeat Satan. Mephisto is amused by his declaration and accepts Rin's wishes, warning him of the dangerous path that lays ahead of him.
3	3	"Brothers"; Transliteration: "Ani to Otōto" (Japanese: 兄と弟)	Shūji Miyahara	Natsuko Takahashi	Yuu Kou	May 1, 2011	October 20, 2012
Rin awaits outside the monastery for Mephisto when suddenly a pink limousine nearly hits him as it pulls up. Mephisto steps out, and to Rin's surprise, his brother Yukio soon joins them. The three ride together to True Cross Academy, where Yukio gives a welcome address to the freshman during orientation ceremony. After exploring the campus, Rin is taken by Mephisto to a secret branch of the school that trains Exorcists covertly referred to as the Cram School. Once class begins, Rin is shocked to discover that Yukio is their instructor, whom he believed had no knowledge of the truth of recent events. As Yukio explains a purification ritual, Rin interrupts with directed questions, leading to a heated exchange between the brothers. Yukio temporarily dismisses the rest of class to continue his conversation with Rin in private. He reveals to Rin that he could see demons since a very young age, and had already became an Exorcist with Shiro's assistance before his death. Tensions rise between the two, especially over what happened to Shiro. During their argument, a vial of foul-smelling animal blood meant to give students without Temptaints the ability to see demons spills, drawing hostile demons to the classroom. Forced to fight side by side, the brothers fend off the attacking demons. Their standoff with the demons reveals deep emotional wounds and unresolved guilt between the brothers. After class concludes, Rin learns that he'll be sharing a dorm building alone with Yukio.
4	4	"Garden of Amahara"; Transliteration: "Amahara no Niwa" (Japanese: 天空(アマハラ)の庭)	Junichi Sakata	Shinsuke Ōnishi	Junichi Sakata	May 8, 2011	October 27, 2012
Yukio sets off to the academy's Exorcist shop to stock up on some supplies along with Rin, where they find that the owner's daughter, Shiemi Moriyama, is being afflicted by a demon that dwells within her family's garden, causing her to lose the ability of using her own legs. Shiemi, however, refuses to leave the garden as it was her late grandmother's and is determined to keep up the plants' well-being. Yukio examines Shiemi's legs and suspects it might be a Dekalp, a demon that possesses grass and trees. Later that night, the Dekalp transforms into a flower and being merging with Shiemi's body, prompting the brothers to work together to eliminate the demon. Inspired by their bravery to save her, Shiemi decides to leave the garden and enroll in the academy to become an Exorcist herself.
5	5	"A Boy From the Cursed Temple"; Transliteration: "Tatari-dera no Ko" (Japanese: 祟り寺の子)	Toshimasa Kuroyanagi	Ryōta Yamaguchi	Toshimasa Kuroyanagi	May 15, 2011	November 3, 2012
Rin dreams of becoming the best Exorcist and is suddenly jolted awake during class. Ryuji "Bon" Suguro can't believe someone like Rin is in the Cram School. Rin, determined to change, tries focusing but continues spacing out. During a test review, Rin laughs at Shiemi's low score until he sees his own score: a 2. Ryuji, who scored 98, scolds him for not taking class seriously and the two nearly fight. Later, Rin sits down with Yukio and Shiemi. Shiemi asks if Rin has any friends and offers her own friendship, but Ryuji interrupts and mocks them. Rin denies being friends with Shiemi, which upsets her. During training, Rin and Ryuji compete to outrun a Reaper demon. They once again fight but are stopped by their instructor, Kaoru Tsubaki. Rin learns that Ryuji's goal is also to defeat Satan, and to restore his temple ruined by the Blue Night, an event from 16 years ago where Satan killed many top clergymen. Rin realizes they essentially share the same goal. When class is cut short by Tsubaki who runs off, Ryuji challenges Rin to touch the Reaper. Rin refuses, but Ryuji himself goes anyway and is attacked. Rin saves him and accidentally controls the Reaper with his words. Yukio is shown to be hidden in the room, gun drawn, but confirms to his superiors that Rin didn't unsheathe Kurikara. Elsewhere, Mephisto is visited by Amaimon, revealing that both are demons and Rin's brothers. Amaimon urges Mephisto to return to Gehenna with him, but Mephisto refuses, preferring to stay in Assiah.
6	6	"The Phantom Chef"; Transliteration: "Maboroshi no Ryōrinin" (Japanese: まぼろしの料理人)	Ryutarō Sakaguchi	Ryōta Yamaguchi	Tensai Okamura	May 22, 2011	November 10, 2012
Rin rushes into the dorm's cafeteria to find Yukio calmly eating breakfast, with a plate already set out for him. At school, Rin and Ryuji fight over a sandwich while three girls offer Yukio handmade lunches. Uncomfortable, Yukio escapes to the cafeteria with Rin, who is amazed by the gourmet meals until he sees the outrageous prices. They ask Mephisto to reduce costs, but he refuses, citing the need for premium ingredients and chefs. Yukio suggests they buy groceries and cook at their dorm. That night, Rin prepares their lunches, only to find them missing the next morning. Suspecting Yukio, who denies it, the brothers investigate and find Mephisto cooking and filling in for Ukobach, his stove spirit familiar, who had been offended by their intrusion into his kitchen. Later that night, Rin and Ukobach engage in a cooking battle, leading to mutual respect and newfound friendship. The next day, Shiemi visits the dorm but is followed by the jealous three girls, who suspect romance between her and Yukio. Breaking in, they mistake Ukobach's food for Shiemi's and trash it out before making their own. Furious, Ukobach begins cooking the girls in a pot as revenge. Rin and Yukio intervene and calm him down. The girls realize Yukio avoided their lunches out of awkwardness. Upon this revelation, Rin forces him to eat them anyway. Later, Yukio is granted time off by Mephisto due to being sick from overeating. Rin and Ukobach surprise Yukio with a massive stamina lunch, prompting him to groan and declare that he hates lunch.
7	7	"A Flock of Plovers"; Transliteration: "Tomochidori" (Japanese: 友千鳥)	Mamoru Enomoto	Natsuko Takahashi	Yumi Kamakura	May 29, 2011	November 17, 2012
The Cram School class must attend a week-long boot camp in preparation for their exam to qualify as an Esquire, which is an Exorcist candidate. Later, another instructor named Igor Neuhaus teaches the class on how to summon familiars. After both are the only ones able to summon familiars, Shiemi is eager to befriend fellow student Izumo Kamiki, but Izumo simply takes advantage of Shiemi's kindness and makes her do personal errands and labor for her, declaring it to be acts of friendship. Rin soon realizes that Izumo taking advantage of Shiemi and tells her, but she dismisses the notion, saying she wants to make friends and be strong enough to protect them. Meanwhile in the dorm's bathroom, Izumo's best friend Paku is attacked by a Naberius ghoul and Izumo summons her white fox familiars, but they turn against her due to her fear. Shiemi arrives and protects Paku while the Okumura brothers battle the Naberius, who proceeds to flee and run back to his handler, Neuhaus.
8	8	"Now a Certain Man Was Sick..."; Transliteration: "Koko ni Yameru Mono Ari" (Japanese: 此(ここ)に病める者あり)	Yasutaka Yamamoto	Shinsuke Ōnishi	Yasutaka Yamamoto	June 5, 2011	November 24, 2012
The next day at the dorm, still troubled after finding out that her friend Paku is deciding to leave the Cram School, Kamiki gets involved in an argument with Ryuji and the entire class ends up being punished by Yukio as a result. Just after Yukio leaves, the students are attacked and cornered by the same Naberius ghoul from yesterday. Shiemi uses her familiar to create a plant barrier between them and the ghoul. Rin tries to lead the ghoul away from the others but it splits in half, leaving Ryuji and the others to fend for themselves against the other half. They students manage to defeat both halves of the ghoul, with Rin learning that the Naberius was sent after them by Neuhaus, who wanted to confirm that Rin was the son of Satan. After the incident, Izumo thanks Shiemi for saving her during the attack. Yukio arrives back at the dorm, with Neuhaus right behind him.
9	9	"Memories"; Transliteration: "Omoide" (Japanese: おもひで)	Yoshiyuki Fujiwara	Shinsuke Ōnishi	Yoshiyuki Fujiwara	June 12, 2011	December 1, 2012
Mephisto appears along with other Exorcists and reveals to the students that the ghoul attack was actually part of the Exwire exam and how they dealt with the threat will count as part of their evaluation. Yukio confronts Neuhaus about him forcing Rin to use his demonic powers during the exam and he claims that he did it under Mephisto's orders. As they recover from their injuries, the students reflect on their performances during the exam. Later that same night at the dorm, Yukio realizes after a private conversation with him that Neuhaus will attempt to kill Rin, and the brothers face him as he summons his strongest Naberius ghoul to fight them on the dorm's rooftop. After Yukio eliminates the Naberius by defacing its summoning circle, Neuhaus reveals to the brothers that he is a survivor from the Blue Night, the night 16 years ago when Satan slaughtered every Exorcist he came across, and that he lost his eye and entire family during the event. He declares he won't forgive any demons for the incident, especially the son of Satan, before leaving. Mephisto promotes the students to Exwires and they all celebrate the occasion by going out for monjayaki, where he calls his brother Amaimon to return to Assiah to provoke Rin after Neuhaus failed to complete his orders.
10	10	"Black Cat"; Transliteration: "Ketto Shī" (Japanese: 黒猫(ケットシー))	Junichi Sakata	Ikuko Takahashi	Junichi Sakata	June 19, 2011	December 8, 2012
On a hot day, Rin accompanies Yukio on a mission. The threat is Kuro, a cat familiar formerly cared to by Shiro, who went gone berserk after hearing that his master died, yelling at the Exorcists present that they were all lying about his death though only Rin could understand him through telepathy due to being a demon himself. Kuro was previously a guardian deity, but turned into a demon after his shrine was demolished. Shiro was the only Exorcist able to calm him down without hurting him and the two became friends as a result. When Yukio is about to use the secret item that Shiro gave him if ever Kuro went on a rampage, Rin tells him to wait and allow him to calm the cat down. Rin talks to Kuro, realizing the cat was only sad and lonely due to the death of Shiro and they bond by talking about their relationship with the man. Kuro finally accepts the fact that Shiro is dead and accepts Rin as his new caretaker. Rin and Yukio later discover that the item Shiro gave Yukio was actually his silver vine sake, a special present that Kuro takes delight in drinking.
11	11	"Demon of the Deep Seas"; Transliteration: "Shinkai no Akuma" (Japanese: 深海の悪魔)	Shinya Kawatsura	Shinsuke Ōnishi	Tonari Kamiigusa	June 26, 2011	December 18, 2012
Rin, Izumo and Renzo are dispatched on their first Exwire field assignment to a coastal village plagued by a sea creature whose inky emissions have tainted the surrounding waters. During the mission, Izumo encounters a local boy named Yohei, whose father disappeared six months earlier while confronting the beast in the ocean. Yohei believes the creature took his father's life and seeks revenge against the creature. Moved by Yohei's determination, especially after he compliments her as being cute, Izumo agrees to keep an eye on him to prevent any rash actions on his part. Meanwhile, Rin and Renzo come face-to-face with the monster. Rin's familiar Kuro attempts to fight the beast but is quickly overpowered. Just as things escalate, Yohei joins the fray with a harpoon in hand, vowing to kill the creature. Before Rin can unsheathe his weapon to protect the boy, an unexpected figure intervenes: Yohei's missing father, who is revealed to be alive and well. It turns out the creature had spared him and during those six months the two formed a bond. The father eventually convinced the creature to return him home. The father and son reunite, putting an end to the grudge with the monster as it returns to the ocean. Later, as the Exwire trio wait for their ride back to the academy, Yohei stops by with his dog to say goodbye. Izumo is embarrassed to learn that Yohei's earlier compliment was because she reminded him of his pet, who also happens to have fuzzy eyebrows.
12	12	"A Game of Tag"; Transliteration: "Onigokko" (Japanese: 鬼事(おにごっこ))	Tadahito Matsubayashi	Ikuko Takahashi	Tadahito Matsubayashi	July 3, 2011	December 25, 2012
Rin and his classmates visit an amusement park named Mepphyland for a mission. Yukio assigns the Exwires to locate a ghost rumored to haunt the park, splitting them into teams as Rin is paired with Shiemi. As the two walk, Shiemi shares her excitement, revealing it's her first time at a theme park. Rin hears crying near the merry-go-round and finds the ghost, a young boy who laments about getting sick and dying before ever visiting the park. Though initially sad, the boy turns mischievous and touches Shiemi inappropriately, angering Rin who proceeds to chase the ghost. While the two are split up, Amaimon appears and steals Rin's sword, unsheathing it and revealing Rin's demonic powers. He taunts Rin and provokes him into fight to get the sword back. Amaimon overpowers Rin, but he eventually unleashes a surge of blue flames and nearly incinerates Amaimon in a berserk state. Meanwhile, Shiemi empathizes with the ghost and captures him in an inflatable ball pit playpen. During Rin and Amaimon's scuffle, debris from a roller coaster threatens Shiemi in the playpen. After hearing her cries, Rin regains his senses and saves her with a flame-formed hand. The ghost, content with his final day of fun at the park, disappears. As Amaimon prepares to destroy Rin's sword, fellow classmate Yamada intervenes and saves Rin. Amaimon ends the fight and sheaths the sword, with Rin returning to normal and shaken by his loss of control. Shiemi and Yukio rush to his side, where Yamada reveals himself to actually be a female high-class Exorcist named Shura Kirigakure.
13	13	"Proof"; Transliteration: "Shōmei" (Japanese: 証明)	Mamoru Enomoto	Ryōta Yamaguchi	Atsushi Takahashi	July 10, 2011	January 1, 2013
Shura had been a former apprentice of Shiro, and posed as one of Rin's classmates because she was tasked to investigate his connection with Satan. Shiro had requested Shura to look after Rin should something happen to him. With orders to kill him if his connection is proven true, she is divided between fulfilling her duty and keeping Shiro's request. Her doubts are cleared when she discovers that Rin loved Shiro as his father, and Shiro was actually raising him as a son, not a weapon against Satan.
14	14	"A Fun Camping Trip"; Transliteration: "Tanoshii Kyanpu" (Japanese: 愉しいキャンプ)	Ryutarō Sakaguchi	Ikuko Takahashi	Kotaro Tamura	July 17, 2011	January 8, 2013
At the start of summer vacation, the class must take part in a three-day drill. Rin remembers Shiro and is happy he has finally found friends. The class must find peg lanterns hidden in the forest and return with them. Rin, Shiemi, Ryuji, Renzo, and Konekomaru find one of the peg lanterns, a demon that consumes living things, and work together to transport it across a bridge. The plan goes awry when Rin accidentally destroys the bridge and awakens a chuchi, an insect demon.
15	15	"Act of Kindness"; Transliteration: "Yasashii Koto" (Japanese: やさしい事)	Toshimasa Kuroyanagi	Ikuko Takahashi	Kazuma Fujimori	July 24, 2011	January 15, 2013
Ryuji saves Rin from the chuchi, displaying a strong friendship between them. The students return to camp, which is attacked by Amaimon and his behemoth familiar. Amaimon forces Rin to fight again, and Ryuji, Konekomaru and Renzo try to help but are defeated. Having no other way to protect his friends, Rin is forced to reveal his secret. He easily overpowers Amaimon but quickly loses control and goes on a rampage, cracking Kurikara in the process.
16	16	"The Wager"; Transliteration: "Kake" (Japanese: 賭)	Junichi Sakata	Shinsuke Ōnishi	Junichi Sakata	July 31, 2011	January 22, 2013
Arthur Auguste Angel, the Paladin, captures Rin and brings him before the Vatican, where Mephisto is placed on trial for treason. Rin's friends offer their help, except for Konekomaru, who is too afraid. The group travels to a temple in Kyoto to fix Rin's cracked sword, where Yukio and Ryuji are plunged into doubt by mara, the statue demons, that tell them to kill Rin. At the Vatican, Mephisto states that his reason for keeping Rin alive is to have him defeat Satan. The trial is interrupted by an enraged Amaimon, eager to beat Rin.
17	17	"Temptation"; Transliteration: "Yūwaku" (Japanese: 誘惑)	Shinpei Ezaki	Ryōta Yamaguchi	Yumi Kamakura	August 7, 2011	January 26, 2013
The Grigori accepts Mephisto's bet, which is whether Rin will come to defeat Satan or join him. Rin defeats Amaimon once more, and the Grigori gives him six months to pass the Exorcist exam. Rin's friends now have mixed feelings about him after learning of his relationship with Satan. Shura gives Rin his first training assignment to learn to control his flames. Konekomaru is haunted by a gufu, a crow demon that preys on his fear of Rin; Izumo and Rin are then attacked by that same demon.
18	18	"Gale"; Transliteration: "Gufū" (Japanese: 颶風(グフウ))	Takahiro Harada	Ryōta Yamaguchi	Tensai Okamura	August 14, 2011	February 2, 2013
The gufu has possessed Konekomaru to convince him to kill Rin. Knowing Konekomaru is possessed, Rin attacks him, going for the gufu, but this creates a misunderstanding with his friends. Shura locates a portal to an abandoned laboratory in a forest. Ryuji witnesses Konekomaru succumbing to the gufu. Rin slays the gufu and saves his life. Ashamed of causing so much trouble, Konekomaru decides to leave the academy, but Rin convinces him to stay, which helps him reconcile with the others.
Alternate Ending Arc (Episodes disregarded in subsequent seasons)
19	19	"An Ordinary Day"; Transliteration: "Nandemonai Hi" (Japanese: なんでもない日)	Yoshiyuki Fujiwara	Ikuko Takahashi	Yoshiyuki Fujiwara	August 21, 2011	February 9, 2013
The Esquires decide to throw a surprise birthday party for Izumo. However, Izumo finds out and says that the party should also be dedicated to those whose birthdays have already passed. The friends then include those whose birthdays are yet to come. In the end, the party becomes a celebration to everyone's birthdays and friendship. Yukio confides to Shiemi that he does not really know his and Rin's true birthday because Shiro told them it was December 27, but that was the day he met them orphaned. Yukio then receives a call for help, revealing their monastery has been attacked.
20	20	"Mask"; Transliteration: "Kamen" (Japanese: 假面(カメン))	Kazuhide Kondo	Shinsuke Ōnishi	Tensai Okamura	August 28, 2011	February 16, 2013
The brothers discover that their monastery was attacked by a masked man whose objective is to kill Satan's relatives. Yukio tranquilizes Rin to keep him from going after the man, upsetting Shura, who feels the move was unlike him. She motivates Rin to control his flames. Ryuji, Konekomaru and Renzo are held hostage by the masked man and Mephisto is arrested by Arthur for unauthorized biological research. Rin manages to control his flames, saving his friends. The culprit flees, and Shura realizes that it is a woman, who is Neuhaus's wife.
21	21	"The Secret Garden"; Transliteration: "Himitsu no Hanazono" (Japanese: 秘密の花園)	Ryutarō Sakaguchi	Ryōta Yamaguchi	Takuya Igarashi	September 4, 2011	February 23, 2013
Yukio meets Ernst Frederik Egin, who claims to be his grandfather and reveals the truth about his mother Yuri Egin, who was killed by the Vatican. Rin and Shura learn that Neuhaus's wife, Michelle Neuhaus, is dead and is now a reanimated corpse possessed by a spider demon. Michelle is now in Shiemi's garden. Arthur comes to slay her but when Rin risks his life for her, Michelle realizes he is good, and dies protecting him. Ernst takes over the True Cross Order, appointing Yukio as the new Paladin.
22	22	"Demon Hunting"; Transliteration: "Akuma Gari" (Japanese: 悪魔狩り)	Shinpei Ezaki	Ryōta Yamaguchi	Atsushi Takahashi	September 11, 2011	March 2, 2013
Armed with special weapons, the Esquires take part in a widespread crusade to destroy all demons, even the good ones. They start questioning the True Cross Order's actions. Yukio is doing it because Ernst claimed it will help destroy Gehenna, the demon world, meaning both Yukio and Rin would be human again. Rin is arrested, as Ernst plans to use him as a living sacrifice to open the Gehenna Gate. Yukio attempts to intervene, but once their friends reach them, they find that Yukio had demonic powers, which he did not know he had, have also awakened.
23	23	"Truth"; Transliteration: "Shinjitsu" (Japanese: 真実)	Mamoru Enomoto	Ryōta Yamaguchi	Mamoru Sasaki	September 18, 2011	March 9, 2013
Ernst opens the Gehenna Gate so he can destroy Gehenna. When Yukio's blood mixes with that of Rin, it awakens his demonic powers. Satan shows Yuri's past to Yukio. She was an Exorcist who let him possess her so he could experience Assiah, the human world, as a human, and became pregnant with the twins. Enraged, Ernst ordered her dead. Satan unintentionally caused the Blue Night to free Yuri, who gave birth before dying. Mephisto and Shiro were sent to kill her children, but Shiro was unable to do it, adopting them instead. In the present, Satan possesses Yukio.
24	24	"Satan's Spawn"; Transliteration: "Satan no Ko" (Japanese: 魔神(サタン)の落胤(こ))	Toshimasa Kuroyanagi	Ryōta Yamaguchi	Tomohiko Itō	September 25, 2011	March 16, 2013
Rin and his friends are defeated by Satan, and flee as Satan begins destroying the town. While the other Esquires help evacuate the academy, Rin manages to get his brother to regain consciousness, though Satan's possession causes him to shoot Rin. The shock from shooting his brother, the only family he has left, causes Yukio to break through and finally expel Satan from his body, and the brothers reconcile.
25	25	"Stop, Time"; Transliteration: "Toki yo Tomare" (Japanese: 時よ止まれ)	Tensai Okamura	Ryōta Yamaguchi	Tensai Okamura	October 2, 2011	March 23, 2013
Hordes of demons come through the Gehenna Gate, torturing everyone until the Esquires come up with a plan to open a gate to the Vatican, where it is daytime, and reflect the sunlight from there back to the Academy, where it is nighttime, to weaken the monsters. Rin and Yukio seize this opportunity and combine their demonic powers, destroying the Gehenna Gate. One month later, things are back to normal at True Cross Academy and the twins pay a visit to their mother's grave before returning to their duties as Exorcists.

== Home media release ==
=== Japanese ===
Aniplex (Japan – Region 2/A)
Vol.	Episodes	Cover character(s)	Release date	Ref.
1	1–2	Rin Okumura and Shiro Fujimoto	June 22, 2011	
2	3–5	Yukio Okumura and Shiemi Moriyama	July 27, 2011	
3	6–8	Ryuji Suguro, Konekomaru Miwa, Renzo Shima, Izumo Kamiki and Noriko Paku	August 24, 2011	
4	9–11	Rin Okumura and Kuro	September 21, 2011	
5	12–13 + OVA	Rin Okumura and Shura Kirigakure	October 26, 2011	
6	14–15	Mephisto Pheles and Amaimon	November 23, 2011	
7	16–18	Ryuji Suguro, Konekomaru Miwa, Renzo Shima, Shiemi Moriyama and Izumo Kamiki	December 14, 2011	
8	19–21	Arthur A. Angel and Igor Neuhaus	January 25, 2012	
9	22–23	Shiro Fujimoto and Yuri Egin	February 22, 2012	
10	24–25	Rin Okumura and Yukio Okumura	March 21, 2012	

=== English ===
Aniplex of America (North America – Region 1/A)
Box	Episodes	Release date	Ref.
1	1–12 + OVA	July 9, 2013	
2	13–25	September 10, 2013	
Complete	1–25 + OVA	June 27, 2017	
