= Jirō Sakagami =

Japanese comedian, actor, and singer

Jirō Sakagami (坂上 二郎, Sakagami Jirō; 16 April 1934 – 10 March 2011) was a Japanese comedian, actor, and singer.

== Career ==
Sakagami was born in Kagoshima Prefecture but spent most of his childhood in Manchukuo. Winning an NHK song contest at age 19, he headed to Tokyo to try to make a name in the entertainment business, eventually training as a comedian at the Asakusa strip clubs. It was there that he met Kin'ichi Hagimoto and the two formed the owarai duo Konto No. 55 in 1966. Konto No. 55 became nationally famous, starring in several popular television shows such as Let's Appear Together on No. 55: Definitive Edition!. Sakagami continued to release songs and branched out into acting, appearing in television dramas as well as in films such as Nagisa Ōshima's Taboo.

While playing golf one day in September 2003, Sakagami collapsed due to cerebral infarction. One of the other players was a doctor, thus, Jiro was immediately hospitalized and made a return to the industry in June of 2004.

He died of another stroke on 10 March 2011 at a Tochigi Prefecture hospital.

== Partial filmography ==
- Hatsukoi sengen (1968) - Manager
- Hakuchû dôdô (1968)
- Konto gojugo-go: Seiki no daijukuten (1968) - Yota Kitagawa
- Kamisama no koibito (1968)
- Hitokiri-O Castigo (1969)
- Konto 55-gō jinrui no daijakuten (コント55号 人類の大弱点) (1969)
- Konto55go-ore wa ninja no mago (1969) - Konto No. 55
- Mito Kômon man'yûki (1969) - Jirobei
- Konto 55-gō uchū no daibōken (コント55号 宇宙大冒険) (1969)
- Namida no nagashi uta inochi azukemasu (1970) - Patron
- Kigeki sore ga otoko no ikiru michi (1970)
- Futari de hitori (1970)
- Fuji Keiko Waga uta no arukagiri (1971)
- Konto Gojugo-go to Miko no zettai zetsumei (1971) - Jiro Sakamoto
- The Last Samurai (1974)
- Kigeki damashi no jingi (1974)
- Kigeki: onna no naki-dokoro (1975)
- Hadashi no seishun (1975)
- Seisyun no Kôzu (1976) - Gorô Sakaguchi
- Omatsuri yarô: uogashi no kyôdai-bun (1976)
- Inubue (1978) - Cab driver
- Edo no Taka (1978)- House keeper/Spy
- Nutcracker Fantasy (1979) - Chinese Wiseman (Japanese version, voice)
- Kindaichi Kosuke no boken (1979) - Goemon Ishida
- The Highest Honor (1982) - Kimura
- Kono ko no nanatsu no oiwai ni (1983) - Ikumatsu
- Amagigoe (天城越え Amagigoe) (1983) - Sweet Shop Owner
- Okinawa no shonen (1983) - Production chief
- Shiosai (1985)
- A Class to Remember (学校 Gakko) (1993)
- Kappa (1994) - Village Mayor
- Anne no Nikki (1995) - Mr. Hans Van Dann (Hermann van Pels) (voice)
- Sada: Gesaku · Abe Sada no shôgai (1998) - Risaburo Miyazaki
- Taboo (御法度 Gohatto) (1999) - Lieutenant Genzaburo Inoue
- Drug (2001) - Shoichiro Hirakawa
- Shin yukiguni (2001) - Kobayashi
- Fukumimi (2003)
- Hokushin naname ni sasu tokoro (2007) - Sanada (final film role)
