= Kazuki Kosakai =

Japanese comedian and actor

- 小堺 一機
- Born: January 3, 1956 (age 70); Ichikawa, Chiba, Japan
- Notable work: Lion no Gokigen'yoh
- Children: Shōta Kosakai

Comedy career
- Years active: 1977–present

Notes
- Same year/generation as: George Tokoro; Shoji Murakami; LaSalle Ishii

Kazuki Kosakai (小堺一機, Kosakai Kazuki) (born January 3, 1956) is a Japanese comedian and actor from Ichikawa, Chiba. He is attached to Asaikikaku.

== Roles ==
=== Television programs ===
==== Television drama ====
- Sērā Fukudōri (1986) (Tanaka-sensei)
- Furuhata Ninzaburō (1994) (Shigeo Sakomizu)
- Boku dake no Madonna (2003) (Shō Ichigaya)
- Yae's Sakura (2013) (Iwakura Tomomi)

==== Variety shows ====
- Lion no Gokigen'yoh (1991 - 2016)

==== Animation ====
- Demashita! Powerpuff Girls Z (xxxx) (Episode 41 Part A narrator)
- Coji-Coji (xxxx) (Haukyū-kun)
- The Powerpuff Girls (xxxx) (The Talking Dog, The Narrator)

=== Film ===
- Godzilla vs. SpaceGodzilla (xxxx) (Sapporo Salary Man (section manager))
- No Yōnamono (xxxx) (Kawashima)
- Supermarket Woman (xxxx) (Head of Sales Promotion)
- School Meals Time: Road to Ikameshi (2024) (Isao Sakazume)
- School Meals Time: School Excursion Inferno (2025) (Isao Sakazume)

=== Dubbing roles ===
==== Live-action ====
- Spy Kids series (Fegan Floop (Alan Cumming))

==== Animation ====
- Cats Don't Dance (Danny)

== Impression repertoire ==
- Jōji Abe
- Takejō Aki
- Kinichi Hagimoto
- Sei Hiraizumi (as Atsuo Itō from Good Luck!!)
- Goro Ibuki
- Ikko
- Junji Inagawa
- Mikijirō Hira
- Gō Katō
- Shintaro Katsu
- Kinya Kitaōji
- Masaomi Kondō
- Yutaka Mizutani
- Kaori Momoi
- Kensaku Morita
- Takenori Murano
- Kenichi Nagira
- Akira Nakao
- Piiko (Katsuaki Sugiura)
- Zomahoun Idossou Rufin
- Masaaki Sakai
- Hiroshi Sekiguchi
- Sanma Akashiya
- Muneo Suzuki
- Masakazu Tamura (as Furuhata Ninzaburō)
- Kunie Tanaka (as Gorō Kokuban from Kita no Kunikara)
- Sakae Umezu
- Atsushi Watanabe
- Eikichi Yazawa
- Hidetaka Yoshioka (as Jun Kokuban from Kita no Kunikara)
