= Blue Exorcist season 2 =

Second season of the Blue Exorcist anime television series

Blue Exorcist: Kyoto Saga
- Season 2
- First home media volume cover for the season
- No. of episodes: 12

Release
- Original network: MBS, TBS
- Original release: January 7 – March 25, 2017

Season chronology
- ← Previous; Season 1 Next → S3: Shimane Illuminati Saga

Blue Exorcist: Kyoto Saga (Japanese: 青の祓魔師(エクソシスト) 京都不浄王篇, Hepburn: Ao no Ekusoshisuto: Kyōto Fujō Ō-hen) is the second season of the Blue Exorcist anime television series, produced by A-1 Pictures and based on the manga series of the same name by Kazue Kato. Koichi Hatsumi replaced Tensai Okamura as series director. The season aired from January 7 to March 25, 2017, on the Animeism programming block on MBS and TBS. In April 2025, it was announced that the season's English dub would make its broadcast television premiere on Adult Swim's Toonami programming block, where it aired from May 18 to August 17, 2025.

The opening theme song is "Itteki no Eikyō" (一滴の影響; lit. 'Drop's Influence') performed by Uverworld, while the ending theme song is "Kono-te de" (コノ手デ; lit. 'With This Hand') performed by Rin Akatsuki.

== Episodes ==
| No. overall | No. in saga | Title | Directed by | Written by | Storyboarded by | Original release date | English air date |
|---|---|---|---|---|---|---|---|
| 26 | 1 | "Small Beginnings"; Transliteration: "Kōshiranshō" (Japanese: 嚆矢濫觴) | Koichi Hatsumi & Shigeki Kawai | Toshiya Ōno | Koichi Hatsumi | January 7, 2017 | May 18, 2025 |
A masked man releases toxic miasma while fleeing from Exorcists, taking a boy named Satoru hostage. Rin and Shura join Yukio at the scene, where Saburota Todo, director of Deep Keep, reports that the left eye of the Impure King was stolen. The masked man retreats into a building with Satoru. Yukio and Todo enter to investigate, with Rin later following without permission. They discover the thief is a miasma decoy and the stolen eye is fake. Todo suddenly betrays the brothers, revealing his demon form. He injures Yukio and taunts him with nihilistic ideas, hinting at Yukio's inner conflict, before vanishing. When Rin tries to help Satoru, his flames worsen the boy's condition by accelerating the spore growth. Overcoming his emotions, Yukio steadies himself by stabbing his own arm to focus and successfully treats Satoru. Mephisto appears outside, revealing the incident was a diversion as the real left eye was stolen elsewhere. Simultaneously, an attack was also made on the Kyoto Branch, which houses the right eye. Yukio is appointed to lead the recovery mission. Meanwhile, Rin, Shura, Kuro, and the Exwires travel by train to Kyoto. The Exwires are wary about having learned that Rin is Satan's son. Note: Blue Exorcist: Kyoto Saga effectively begins after the eighteenth episode (Note: Although most of the events in episodes 17 and 18 of the first season are original stories not based on the source material (such as the plot of The Gufu), they still contain scenes and dialogue necessary for understanding the beginning of the second season.) of the first season, right at the point where it completely deviates from the manga (excluding several anime original changes or scenes). Continuity-wise, episodes 19–25, which are events exclusive to the anime, are ignored going forward for the series.
| 27 | 2 | "Strange Bedfellows"; Transliteration: "Goetsudoushū" (Japanese: 呉越同舟) | Shigeki Kawai | Seiko Takagi | Shigeki Kawai | January 14, 2017 | May 25, 2025 |
The Exwires are dispatched to aid injured Exorcists recovering at the Suguro Family Inn. Rin, eager to help, is assigned menial trash duty, a reminder of the lingering distrust toward him. While out, he meets an older man slicing watermelons named Tatsuma Suguro, who is Ryuji's father. Rin is surprised by Tatsuma's kind nature, contrasting with Ryuji's tension toward him. They briefly bond before Tatsuma abruptly leaves. Inside the inn, a clash breaks out between the Hojo sisters and Juzo Shima. When one sister summons a snake, Ryuji defuses the situation. The sisters insult Ryuji's father, calling him a lazy drunk priest, which he doesn't dispute. Instead, he scolds them for infighting when the right eye of the Impure King still needs protecting. Meanwhile, Shura and Kinzo investigate the attempted theft, suspecting a mole within the Myoda sect. Uwabami Hojo warns Ryuji that an internal investigation is necessary. Elsewhere, Rin and Renzo share dinner. Despite initially avoiding Rin, Renzo relaxes and their friendship rekindles. Rin unknowingly drinks Shura's beer, gets tipsy, and falls asleep. Renzo carries him indoors. On a road, Yukio's team discovers the gas-masked thief's van and his corpse, while Todo contacts the conspirator within Myoda from elsewhere.
| 28 | 3 | "Suspicion Will Raise Bogies"; Transliteration: "Gishinanki" (Japanese: 疑心暗鬼) | Yū Aoki | Yuichiro Kido | Toshiyuki Fujisawa | January 21, 2017 | June 1, 2025 |
Ryuji wakes up with little memory of the previous night, as he also unknowingly drunk Shura's beer, and shares breakfast with Miwa as they ignore Rin. Renzo greets Rin, who is equally confused about the prior night. After breakfast, Rin asks Ryuji's mother for candles to help practice controlling his flames. Meanwhile, the Myoda sect gathers for a meeting. Yaozo Shima declares that a traitor is among them. Juzo recounts the attempted theft of the right eye inside the Deep Keep, which casts suspicion on Mamushi Hojo and himself since both were former students of Todo. Suspicion also falls on Tatsuma, who missed the meeting and chanted strange sermons during the incident. Elsewhere, Shiemi breaks down before Kamiki, who proceeds to encourage Shiemi by comparing her to a resilient weed which is strong, even if unremarkable. Rin, still struggling with his powers, nearly sets the roof on fire. Ironically, after giving up, the candles finally light properly. Later, Rin finds Miwa at his family's tombstones. When Rin tries to converse, Miwa pushes back, asking him to stay away from Ryuji. He vents his insecurities, but Rin insists he has something worth protecting. Moved, Miwa begins to reconsider Rin's true nature.
| 29 | 4 | "Act of Treachery"; Transliteration: "Haishinkigi" (Japanese: 背信棄義) | Ayako Kōno | Yūsuke Watanabe | Ayako Kōno | January 28, 2017 | June 8, 2025 |
Ryuji secretly tails Juzo to the Deep Keep, finding unconscious Exorcists along the way. Meanwhile, Rin finally manages to intentionally light two candles with his flames. Shura praises his progress but reminds him that his training has just begun. Rin reflects on Mephisto's wager with the Vatican. In the Keep, Juzo confronts Mamushi, who explains she has betrayed Myoda to expose its corruption, citing accusations from Todo that Mephisto concealed the left eye's location. She also mentions the Vatican's recent hearing where Mephisto was outed for protecting Satan's spawn, believing that Todo's cause serves a greater good. Unbeknownst to them, Tatsuma, Yaozo, and Uwabami observe via hidden surveillance. When Juzo and Mamushi clash, Ryuji intervenes. Suddenly, tremors rock the Keep as Rin and Shura race towards it to investigate. Todo arrives inside the Keep from above and manipulates Mamushi into stealing the left eye before both disappear. Ryuji confronts Tatsuma about Mamushi's accusations. Tatsuma insists the matter is classified, leading Ryuji to publicly disown him. Remembering his own father, Rin urges Ryuji to reconcile as his blue flames erupt uncontrollably, shocking the present Myoda members. Juzo knocks him down and Shura restrains him. Yaozo demands answers from Shura regarding Rin.
| 30 | 5 | "Mysterious Connections"; Transliteration: "Aienkien" (Japanese: 合縁奇縁) | Matsuo Asami | Yūsuke Watanabe | Shigeki Kawai | February 4, 2017 | June 15, 2025 |
Yaozo orders Juzo to secretly follow Tatsuma, who discreetly slips an envelope into Shura's pocket. At the Kyoto Branch, Yukio and his team arrive, and Yaozo convenes a meeting to discuss the danger of uniting the left and right eyes of the Impure King. Meanwhile, Mamushi escapes with Todo to a rooftop and appears exhausted from the right eye's miasma. Shura informs Yukio of Rin's earlier outburst and together they go to the confinement room to check up on him. Elsewhere, Shiemi confides in Kamiki about her concerns for Rin and Yukio. Ryuji, Konekomaru, and Renzo report to them that the right eye has been stolen and that Rin was detained after his powers went out of control. Shura gives Rin the envelope from Tatsuma, but only Yukio is able to read its handwriting. The letter recounts events from fifteen years ago: Tatsuma's wife fell ill from the right eye's miasma, and Tatsuma was reprimanded by his father for neglecting the sacred flame. Tatsuma would help maintain the flame with fellow priests. One day a wild demon falls out from the sky with Shiro Fujimoto on top, which destroys the flame. Shiro steals Kurikara, the demon-sealing sword, from the priests.
| 31 | 6 | "A Wolf in Sheep's Clothing"; Transliteration: "Menrihōshin" (Japanese: 綿裏包針) | Takeshi Yajima | Toshiya Ōno | Takeshi Yajima | February 11, 2017 | June 22, 2025 |
Todo and Mamushi flee to the abandoned Myoda stronghold. Tatsuma's letter to Rin continues: Shiro arrived at Myoda fifteen years ago to take the Kurikara sword but got injured from fighting the demon. While recovering, Shiro confided in his intent to use the sword to kill a child, which horrified Tatsuma. However, after Shiro healed Myoda members afflicted from miasma, including Tatsuma's wife and unborn son, Tatsuma decided to trust him and helps him escape with the sword. Months later during the Blue Night, Tatsuma's father perishes and Myoda's greatest secret is revealed by the flame demon Karura to Tatsuma: the Impure King was never killed, but sealed beneath the original stronghold. Karura offers its powers in exchange for absolute secrecy, which Tatsuma accepts. In the present, Todo betrays Mamushi and attempts to kill her in the Impure King's chamber. Tatsuma rescues Mamushi and confronts Todo, who combines both eyes and revives the Impure King. As Juzo arrives, Tatsuma entrusts Mamushi to him. Tatsuma unleashes Karura in an attempt to contain the Impure King but Todo stabs him, revealing he plotted everything to steal Karura's power. Tatsuma's letter ends by urging Rin to use Kurikara to defeat the Impure King.
| 32 | 7 | "Like a Fire Burning Bright"; Transliteration: "Kienbanjō" (Japanese: 気炎万丈) | Ryūta Kawahara | Toshiya Ōno | Toshiyuki Fujisawa | February 18, 2017 | June 29, 2025 |
Yukio fears Rin will become a target if he fights, but Shura argues that Rin should decide for himself and returns Kurikara to him, but he hesitates unsheathing it. Mephisto arrives and arrests Rin, revealing the Vatican has sentenced him to death. Before leaving, Mephisto gives Shura a special set of clothes as Yukio begins organizing an attack on the Impure King. Meanwhile, Mamushi and Juzo return to the sect. Overcome with guilt, Mamushi urges the Myoda forces to fight and rescue Tatsuma. Yaozo issues the order to mobilize. Shura informs the Exwires of Rin's sentence and hands Kurikara to Ryuji. She asks them to help Rin escape from Mephisto's dimensional prison so he can fight with them. Wearing Mephisto's clothes, the Exwires sneak in but the prison senses their hostility and freezes everyone except Shiemi. She finds Rin inside withdrawn, convinced the world would be better without him. Ashamed of not recognizing his pain, Shiemi hugs Rin and apologizes. Her compassion helps Rin recover the will to fight. They escape the prison and Ryuji scolds Rin for not trusting in his friends and carrying everything on his own. Now reconciled, the Exwires unite and head towards the Impure King.
| 33 | 8 | "From Father to Son"; Transliteration: "Fushisōden" (Japanese: 父子相伝) | Yū Aoki | Seiko Takagi | Yū Aoki | February 25, 2017 | July 20, 2025 |
The Impure King's miasma begins spreading, infecting nearby civilians. Shura instructs the Exwires to locate Tatsuma as the Tamers summon Ucchusma, a flame demon effective against miasma, to use its energy to battle the Impure King. Meanwhile, the Rin and the Exwires discover Tatsuma in critical condition. Karura manifests before them, revealing it saved Tatsuma by healing his major injuries. Tatsuma explains that the Impure King will grow to the size of a castle, developing a central sporangium that will eventually burst and release deadly spores across the entire city. At the core of the sporangium lies the demon's heart, which must be destroyed to kill it. Tatsuma's plan was to use his pact with Karura to contain the spores inside a barrier, allowing Rin to cut the heart into two. Due to Tatsuma's current condition, Karura instead suggests forming a new pact with his son Ryuji, but Tatsuma insists against it. Ryuji accepts the proposal anyway, inheriting the sutra to set up the protective barrier himself. Meanwhile, Yukio locates Todo, who is struggling to control Karura's energy that he forcibly bonded with. Todo provokes Yukio, targeting his repressed feelings and questioning whether he secretly harbors hatred toward his brother.
| 34 | 9 | "Through Thick and Thin"; Transliteration: "Setchūshōhaku" (Japanese: 雪中松柏) | Ayako Kōno | Toshiya Ōno | Michio Fukuda | March 4, 2017 | July 27, 2025 |
Yukio confesses he both loves and hates his brother Rin, but admits he despises himself even more. Yukio traps Todo in a water prison using a naiad summoning. Elsewhere, Kuro carries Ryuji and Rin towards the Impure King. After landing on a rock not inflicted miasma, Ryuji successfully casts the barrier. Back on the battlefield, Yukio is nearly spent as Todo breaks free from his water prison. Meanwhile, Renzo and Miwa climb up a tree with only a torch holding off the miasma. Miwa accuses Renzo of cowardice for considering abandoning everyone while they fight for their lives. Renzo, feeling crushed by the burden of others' expectations, initially leaves but returns to protect Miwa. Meanwhile, Kamiki summons her familiars to carry Tatsuma to safety but is suddenly caught by miasma. Shiemi desperately calls Nee for help and successfully summons him. She commands Nee to generate twice the number of plants as there is miasma to combat the infestation. Elsewhere, the miasma multiplies rapidly, pushing Rin and Kuro to their limits. As Todo prepares to finish off Yukio, his eyes momentarily glint bright blue like Rin's, stunning Todo. Before Todo can strike back, Juzo and fellow Exorcists arrive to fight him.
| 35 | 10 | "Unbowed and Unbroken"; Transliteration: "Futōfukutsu" (Japanese: 不撓不屈) | Kengo Matsumoto | Yūsuke Watanabe | Kengo Matsumoto | March 11, 2017 | August 3, 2025 |
The Impure King reveals its true form to be a massive, maggot-like creature. As the demon targets Rin and Ryuji, Yaozo orders the troops to retreat outside the barrier. Meanwhile, Todo battles Juzo and his fellow Exorcists, absorbing all their flame attacks using Karura's immense power. Yukio proposes a reckless plan to Juzo that could cost them. While the Exorcist chant flame sutras, two of them flank Todo to no avail. As Todo taunts them, Juzo suddenly throws a massive ball of flame from above him, causing an overload in his mortal body. The rain reduces Todo's flesh to an ashy puddle, hindering his rapid regeneration abilities. Before the Exorcists get any time to recoup, Todo revives just enough to restrain everyone but Yukio. Meanwhile, Shura charges into the barrier as support. Ryuji begins collapsing from exhaustion due to using Karura's power to protect himself from the demon's spores. Rin refuses to flee and asks Ryuji to visit Kyoto Tower with him the next day if they survive. Ryuji agrees and drops his defenses to reinforce the barrier, placing his faith in Rin who finally draws Kurikara. With newfound control, Rin unleashes a powerful blaze and subdues the Impure King.
| 36 | 11 | "Shine Bright as the Sun"; Transliteration: "Kōkisanzen" (Japanese: 光輝燦然) | Ken'ichi Kuhara & Shigeki Kawai | Seiko Takagi | Hisashi Saito & Shigeki Kawai | March 18, 2017 | August 10, 2025 |
Konekomaru and Renzo meet up with the Myōō Dharani to report about the battle. Yukio continues battling Todo and finally silences him after he claims deep down Yukio is a demon. Yukio and the Exorcists head back to the frontlines. Meanwhile, Shura reaches Rin and Ryuji just before Ryuji collapses, which breaks the barrier. The demon Ucchusma reappears, mocking the humans as weaklings but ultimately fusing with Rin's flames to help defeat the Impure King. In the forest, Shiemi exhausts herself saving Kamiki who angrily rejects her help. Even still, Shiemi saves Kamiki and tells her it doesn't matter if she hates her or not. Back on the battlefield, Rin uses Fireburst Samadhi but almost loses control of his powers once again before regaining his composure and confidence to unleash a massive firestorm that kills the Impure King and cleanses the spores without harming anyone. With the demon finally defeated, Ucchusma leaves Rin as the Exorcists regroup at the site of his victory. Suddenly, Yukio rushes in and punches Rin, furious that he used his powers. Rin, now accepting both sides of himself and asking Yukio to do the same, faints peacefully before dreaming of a brief encounter with Shiro.
| 37 | 12 | "Candid and Open"; Transliteration: "Kyoshintankai" (Japanese: 虚心坦懐) | Shigeki Kawai | Toshiya Ōno | Shigeki Kawai | March 25, 2017 | August 17, 2025 |
Reinforcements arrive by morning and Tatsuma is returned home safely. Juzo informs Mamushi of the Impure King's defeat. Rin awakens beside Kuro and Shiemi, thanking the latter for her support. Shiemi says they'll be friends forever, leaving Rin dismayed at being friend zoned. Later that night, Mephisto arranges for Yaozo to testify in Rin's defense at the Vatican. After Yaozo departs, Shura confronts Mephisto as she suspects he's scheming something. Mephisto brushes her concerns off with veiled threats. Shura warns Yukio to be cautious of Mephisto. Later, Rin finds Yukio asleep in a lobby chair, remarking on how they need to talk. The next day, Tatsuma informs Ryuji that he's stepping down from his role in Myoda to help their mother at the inn. Juzo proposes to Mamushi and receives both father's blessings. In the afternoon, the Exwires and Yukio go sightseeing. Rin finally gets to visit Kyoto Tower. Later, Rin and Yukio sit down by a riverside, where Rin once again declares his goal of becoming an Exorcist despite being Satan's son. Yukio scoffs at this and teases him, despite his own doubts about being surpassed by his older brother. The two of them rejoin the other Exwires nearby.

== Home media release ==
=== Japanese ===
Aniplex (Japan – Region 2/A)
| Vol. | Episodes | Cover character(s) | Release date | Ref. |
|---|---|---|---|---|
| 1 | 1–2 | Rin Okumura and Yukio Okumura | March 8, 2017 | |
| 2 | 3–4 | Ryuji Suguro, Konekomaru Miwa and Renzo Shima | April 12, 2017 | |
| 3 | 5–6 | Kinzo Shima, Juzo Shima and Mamushi Hojo | May 10, 2017 | |
| 4 | 7–8 | Izumo Kamiki and Shiemi Moriyama | June 14, 2017 | |
| 5 | 9–10 | Ryuji Suguro and Tatsuma Suguro | July 12, 2017 | |
| 6 | 11–12 | Rin Okumura and Yukio Okumura | August 9, 2017 | |

=== English ===
Aniplex of America (North America – Region 1/A)
| Vol. | Episodes | Release date | Ref. |
|---|---|---|---|
| 1 | 1–6 | November 14, 2017 | |
| 2 | 7–12 | February 13, 2018 | |
