= The Saint's Magic Power Is Omnipotent =

Japanese light novel series and its franchise

- First light novel volume cover

聖女の魔力は万能です (Seijo no Maryoku wa Bannō Desu)
- Genre: Fantasy, isekai, slice of life
- Novel series
- Written by: Yuka Tachibana
- Published by: Shōsetsuka ni Narō
- Original run: 2016 – present
- Light novel
- Written by: Yuka Tachibana
- Illustrated by: Yasuyuki Syuri
- Published by: Fujimi Shobo
- English publisher: NA: Seven Seas Entertainment
- Imprint: Kadokawa Books
- Original run: February 2017 – present
- Volumes: 9
- Manga
- Written by: Yuka Tachibana
- Illustrated by: Fujiazuki
- Published by: Kadokawa Shoten
- English publisher: NA: Seven Seas Entertainment
- Imprint: Flos Comic
- Magazine: ComicWalker
- Original run: July 2017 – present
- Volumes: 10
- Manga

The Saint's Magic Power Is Omnipotent: The Other Saint
- Written by: Yuka Tachibana
- Illustrated by: Aoagu
- Published by: Kadokawa Shoten
- English publisher: NA: Seven Seas Entertainment
- Imprint: Flos Comic
- Magazine: ComicWalker
- Original run: October 2020 – September 2023
- Volumes: 4
- Anime television series
- Directed by: Shōta Ihata
- Written by: Wataru Watari
- Music by: Kenichi Kuroda
- Studio: Diomedéa
- Licensed by: Crunchyroll; SA/SEA: Muse Communication
- Original network: AT-X, Tokyo MX, MBS, BS11
- Original run: April 6, 2021 – December 19, 2023
- Episodes: 24
- icon

The Saint's Magic Power Is Omnipotent (聖女の魔力は万能です, Seijo no Maryoku wa Bannō Desu) is a Japanese light novel series written by Yuka Tachibana and illustrated by Yasuyuki Syuri. It began serialization online in 2016 on the user-generated novel publishing website Shōsetsuka ni Narō. It was later acquired by Fujimi Shobo, which has published the series since February 2017 under its Kadokawa Books imprint. A manga adaptation with art by Fujiazuki has been serialized online via Kadokawa Shoten's ComicWalker website since July 2017. Both the light novel and manga have been licensed in North America by Seven Seas Entertainment. An anime television series adaptation by Diomedéa aired from April to June 2021, while its second season aired from October to December 2023.

== Premise ==
Sei Takanashi, an office worker, is returning home late at night but is summoned to the magic world of Salutania; the summoning, however, is a one way kidnapping with no way to send her home. Unfazed, Sei follows her own devices and sets her sights on being a researcher at the Medicinal Flora Research Institute, an establishment known for its studies regarding herbs and potions. While indulging in her latest passion, Sei has a fateful encounter with the commander of the Third Order of Knights. But little does she know, her aptitude as a Saint will continue to exert its influence over her new life.

== Characters ==
Sei Takanashi (小鳥遊 聖 / セイ, Takanashi Sei / Sei)
Voiced by: Yui Ishikawa (Japanese); Celeste Perez (English)
A woman in her early 20's that worked in a corporate office. After arriving home very late one evening, she finds herself caught on a magic field then suddenly is sitting on a floor in a medieval-looking location next to a girl that appears to be in her mid to late teens. A red-headed man calling himself the crown prince calls the other woman their "Saint" and ignores Sei. She finds a purpose for herself after discovering the flower and herb garden outside the palace. She has a good knowledge of flowers and herbs and puts them to good use as a researcher at The Medicinal Flora Research Institute. The potions and food she makes are 1.5 times more effective than everyone else's. By just concentrating, she can visually translate the written native languages into Japanese. Her Saint powers are awakened by love; though it doesn't need to be romantic in nature.
Albert Hawke (アルベルト, Aruberuto Hōku)
Voiced by: Takahiro Sakurai (Japanese); Ian Sinclair (English)
Commander of the Third Order of the Knights of the Kingdom of Salutania. After Sei saves him with a high-quality healing potion that she made, he develops romantic feelings for her, though Sei is unaware. He is the third son of a Margrave. He can use ice magic, which is considered rare, to create protective ice walls.
Johan Valdec (ヨハン・ヴァルデック, Yohan Vuarudekk)
Voiced by: Takuya Eguchi (Japanese); David Matranga (English)
He is the director of The Medicinal Flora Research Institute and invites Sei to officially join them. Albert Hawke is an old friend of his. He suspects that Sei might be the true "Saint". His father is a Count. Johan has the ability to use earth-based magic.
Yuri Dreves (ユーリ・ドレヴェス, Yūri Dorevuesu)
Voiced by: Yūsuke Kobayashi (Japanese); Ryan Colt Levy (English)
The Grand Magus of the Kingdom of Salutania and the Director of the Royal Mage Academy. He is the one who summoned Sei and Aira. He used so much of his magic power for the summon that he had to sleep for quite a long time. By the time he wakes up, the misunderstanding the prince caused is over. Once awake Yuri was able to determine that Sei is the true Saint. He can use fire, wind, earth, lightning, ice, and holy magic; he is called the "Inferno Mage" as he uses powerful fire magic that is quite destructive.
Jude (ジュード, Jūdo)
Voiced by: Taku Yashiro (Japanese); Nazeeh Tarsha (English)
A green-haired man that appears to be about Sei's age. He is the son of a wealthy merchant. She first meets him in the flower and herb garden outside the palace. He is a researcher at The Medicinal Flora Research Institute. He is assigned to train Sei after she is accepted at the Institute. He teaches her how to make a basic potion and how magic is used in this world. He has the rare ability for a commoner to use magic which allowed him to attend the Royal Academy. His attribute being water.
Erhart Hawke (エアハルト・ホーク, Eaharuto Hōku)
Voiced by: Yūichirō Umehara (Japanese); Reagan Murdock (English)
The Deputy Director of the Royal Mage Academy. He does the first appraisal of Sei's enchantment ability and reports it to the king. He is one of Albert Hawke's older brothers.
Elizabeth Ashley (エリザベス・アシュレイ, Erizabesu Ashurei)
Voiced by: Reina Ueda (Japanese); Bryn Apprill (English)
A teen-aged noblewoman. She occasionally meets Sei in the palace library and they talk. She becomes a friend of Sei's and allows her to use her nickname of Liz. Elizabeth tells Sei that most of the women refer to Commander Hawke as the "Ice Knight" because he gives the daughters of the nobles the cold shoulder and can use ice magic. She is a daughter of a Marquis, the fiancée of the crown prince and a junior at the Royal Academy, the high school for the noble's children.
Liz originally thought poorly of Aira due to her friendliness with other men (particularly engaged men, including her fiancé), but she was unaware that that Aira was ignorant to the antiquated customs of the kingdom.
Aira Misono (御園 愛良 / アイラ, Misono Aira / Aira / Islay)
Voiced by: Kana Ichinose (Japanese); Natalie Rose (English)
The 16-year-old girl that was summoned alongside Sei. She was initially declared the Saint by the crown prince, and was under his protection initially after witnessing her break down crying in despair that the summoning couldn't be reversed. He promised that he would try and help her return to her home world. She attended the Royal Academy as a senior while under the control of Prince Kyle. Aira unintentionally causes trouble due to being unaware of the class system that wasn't present in her world, but after a confrontation with the crown prince initial conclusions about her were dispelled. After graduating, she joined the Royal Mage Academy to further her studies of magic. She shows an affinity towards water magic.
Kyle Salutania (カイル・スランタニア, Kairu Surantania)
Voiced by: Jun Fukuyama (Japanese); Adam McArthur (English)
The crown prince of the Kingdom of Salutania. He is a senior at the Royal Academy. Due to his ignorance to the other world and its customs, Kyle chose the beautiful young Aira as the saint and ignored Sei. He plotted to keep the kingdom from lashing back at Aira for his stupidity when Sei was confirmed as the real saint.
Rein Salutania (レイン・スランタニア, Rein Surantania)
Voiced by: Aoi Ichikawa (Japanese); Justin Briner (English)
He is the second prince of the Kingdom of Salutania. He is a junior at the Royal Academy. He is also Prince Kyle's brother.
Siegfried Salutania (ジークフリート・スランタニア, Jīkufurīto Surantania)
Voiced by: Jin Yamanoi (Japanese); Kevin M. Connolly (English)
The king of Salutania, a highly aristocratic society where only the nobles have last names. He seems to be very sympathetic towards Sei.
Dominic Goltz (ドミニク・ゴルツ, Dominiku Gorutsu)
Voiced by: Akio Kato (Japanese); David Wald (English)
The Prime Minister of Salutania. He is convinced that Sei is the Saint, but he is concerned about the political fallout if the first prince is proven wrong.
Damian Goltz (ダミアン・ゴルツ, Damian Gorutsu)
Voiced by: Haruki Ishiya (Japanese); Belsheber Rusape Jr. (English)
The son of the Prime Minister along with being a close friend and classmate to the first prince. He expects to inherit his father's office.
Corrina (コリンナ, Korinna)
Voiced by: Mami Koyama (Japanese); Casey Casper (English)
A very experienced "alchemist" (potion maker) in charge of making potions for Klausner's Domain. She shows Sei the only known diary of a previous Saint to help her learn how to activate and use her "Saint's Magic".
Leonhardt (レオンハルト, Reonharuto)
Voiced by: Satoshi Hino (Japanese); Ricco Fajardo (English)
A native of Klausner's Domain that is in charge of their local mercenary squad charged with controlling the monsters. He is very tall and muscular with a friendly attitude. He is not one well versed or used to using proper etiquette when speaking.
Oscar Dunkel (オスカー・ドゥンケル, Osukā Dunkeru)
Voiced by: Ryōta Ōsaka
Oscar is the assistant to the chairman of the company set up to sell Sei's cosmetics that have become hugely popular.
Tenyū (テンユウ)
Voiced by: Chiaki Kobayashi
He is the 16-year-old 18th prince of the Kingdom of Zaidera. He comes to Salutania on a foreign study program.
Seiran (セイラン)
Voiced by: Shin-ichiro Miki
A ship's captain from the Kingdom of Zaidera.

== Media ==
=== Light novels ===
The series written by Yuka Tachibana began serialization online in 2016 on the user-generated novel publishing website Shōsetsuka ni Narō. It was later acquired by Fujimi Shobo, who have published it as a light novel with illustrations by Yasuyuki Syuri in nine volumes since February 2017 under their Kadokawa Books imprint. The light novel is licensed in North America by Seven Seas Entertainment.

No.	Original release date	Original ISBN	English release date	English ISBN
1	February 10, 2017	978-4-04-072185-9	November 24, 2020	978-1-64-505850-2
2	September 8, 2017	978-4-04-072366-2	February 16, 2021	978-1-64-505955-4
3	October 10, 2018	978-4-04-072616-8	May 4, 2021	978-1-64-827205-9
4	May 10, 2019	978-4-04-072617-5	November 23, 2021	978-1-64-827296-7
5	February 10, 2020	978-4-04-073488-0	January 11, 2022	978-1-64-827363-6
6	September 10, 2020	978-4-04-073489-7	March 22, 2022	978-1-63-858166-6
7	May 8, 2021	978-4-04-073924-3	December 6, 2022	978-1-63-858636-4
8	March 10, 2022	978-4-04-074370-7; 978-4-04-074404-9 (SE)	July 18, 2023	978-1-63-858884-9
9	March 10, 2023	978-4-04-074787-3; 978-4-04-074885-6 (SE)	January 9, 2024	979-8-88-843108-5

=== Manga ===
A manga adaptation with art by Fujiazuki has been serialized online via Kadokawa Shoten's ComicWalker website since July 2017 and has been collected in eleven tankōbon volumes. The manga is also licensed in North America by Seven Seas Entertainment. and Czech Republic by GATE. A spin-off manga series illustrated by Aoagu, titled The Saint's Magic Power Is Omnipotent: The Other Saint, began serialization on the ComicWalker site in October 2020 until September 2023. The spin-off manga is also licensed by Seven Seas Entertainment.

No.	Original release date	Original ISBN	English release date	English ISBN
1	February 5, 2018	978-4-04-069683-6	December 8, 2020	978-1-64-505853-3
2	October 5, 2018	978-4-04-069988-2	February 23, 2021	978-1-64-505983-7
3	July 5, 2019	978-4-04-065804-9	July 6, 2021	978-1-64-827250-9
4	February 5, 2020	978-4-04-064372-4	December 21, 2021	978-1-64-827378-0
5	October 5, 2020	978-4-04-064885-9	March 1, 2022	978-1-63858-106-2
6	June 5, 2021	978-4-04-680463-1	October 11, 2022	978-1-63858-308-0
7	December 3, 2021	978-4-04-680943-8	February 28, 2023	978-1-63858-793-4
8	December 16, 2022	978-4-04-681514-9	January 16, 2024	978-1-68579-502-3
9	December 14, 2023	978-4-04-682585-8	June 25, 2024	979-8-88843-782-7
10	January 17, 2025	978-4-04684-134-6	September 30, 2025	979-8-89160-664-7
11	February 16, 2026	978-4-04685-668-5	—	—

==== The Other Saint ====
No.	Original release date	Original ISBN	English release date	English ISBN
1	April 5, 2021	978-4-04-680380-1	October 18, 2022	978-1-64827-838-9
2	December 3, 2021	978-4-04-680944-5	May 2, 2023	978-1-63858-730-9
3	September 16, 2022	978-4-04-681515-6	December 12, 2023	979-8-88843-074-3
4	September 14, 2023	978-4-04-682587-2	July 2, 2024	979-8-88843-796-4

=== Anime ===
On September 7, 2020, Kadokawa announced that the series would be receiving an anime adaptation. It was later revealed to be a television series animated by Diomedéa. The series is directed by Shōta Ihara, with Wataru Watari overseeing scripts, Masakazu Ishikawa designing the characters, Kenichi Kuroda composing the series' music, and Aira Yūki serving as music producer. The series aired from April 6 to June 22, 2021, on AT-X and other networks. Yūki also performed the opening theme song, "Blessing", while NOW ON AIR performed the ending theme song, "Page for Tomorrow". Funimation streamed the series outside of Asia, which was subsequently moved to Crunchyroll following Sony's acquisition. On July 13, 2021, Funimation started streaming their English dub of the anime. Muse Communication has licensed the series in South and Southeast Asia and is streaming it on their Muse Asia YouTube channel.

On March 9, 2022, it was announced that the series will be receiving a second season. The main staff members are returning to reprise their roles. It aired from October 3 to December 19, 2023. The opening theme song is "Semisweet Afternoon" by Aira Yūki, while the ending theme song is "Lilac Melody" by Aina Suzuki.

==== Episodes ====
===== Season 1 (2021) =====
No. overall	No. in season	Title	Directed by (Note: Information is taken from the ending credits of each episode.)	Written by	Original release date
1	1	"Summoning"; Transliteration: "Shōkan" (Japanese: 召喚)	Shōta Ihata	Shōta Ihata	April 6, 2021
Sei Takanashi is just getting home from her office job when a summoning circle transports her to another world. When she arrives in this new world, there is another girl next to her that a prince takes immediate interest in, calling the other girl a "saint" and completely ignoring Sei. Sei is taken to another room where it is explained to her why she was summoned: dark magic is gathering in the kingdom, corrupting the land, and only a saint's magic can stop it. After being snubbed right after she arrives, Sei is uninterested and just wants to go home, but it is impossible and she reluctantly agrees to stay in the palace. Later, Sei takes a walk in the gardens and meets a man named Jude in the herb garden. He invites her to join the Magical Flora Research Institute where she meets the director, Johan Valdec, and becomes a potion researcher, moving into the Institute. On her first try making potions, she crafts one that is 50% more potent than normal. She has just finished creating her own high potion when the Third Order of Knights returns from the Western Woods extremely wounded after a salamander (a monster that breathes fire but is not a dragon) attack. She uses it to completely heal the Knight Commander's mortal wounds. Johan reports Sei's abilities to one of the King's advisors.
2	2	"Companionship"; Transliteration: "Shinkō" (Japanese: 親交)	Ageha Kochōran	Wataru Watari	April 13, 2021
Sei has been making cosmetics for herself, which has seemingly affected her vision as she no longer needs her glasses to see. As a thank you for making the healing potions for the knights and incidentally getting the Institute more funding, Johan asks her if there's anything she wants as a reward. She asks for a personal kitchen so she can cook for herself, though doesn't tell Johan it's because the food the cooks make there is disgusting. Sei meets the Knight Commander she saved, Albert Hawke, who wanted to thank her in person and offers to take her into the forest to forage for herbs. They both seem interested in the other, which Johan teases them for. She continues to impress by cooking with "medicinal herbs" while in the forest, and Albert flirts with her. The next day, Johan tells Sei her cooking seems to boost various physical abilities and to not cook for a while so as not to attract unwanted attention. He gives Sei the day off and she spends it in the palace library where she meets Elizabeth Ashley. She and Elizabeth become fast friends and Sei offers to make her cosmetics. She also helps a young lady at the Royal Academy, Nicole Adler, with her acne.
3	3	"Capital"; Transliteration: "Ōto" (Japanese: 王都)	Ageha Kochōran	Sō Sagara	April 20, 2021
One particularly hot day, Albert asks Sei out on a date. While out, she learns Albert has rare Ice magic when he creates ice cubes for her water. At the end of the date, he gifts Sei a hairpin she was looking at in a shop in town. The next day, Johan asks about their date only to learn Sei didn't think it was a date. Nevertheless, he is amused when he learns his best friend gifted her something. Later, Elizabeth explains the custom of someone gifting the person they fancy with a gift that matches the giver's eye color, which is why the stones on her hairpin match Albert's. Jude tells her her hairpin is enchanted, inspiring Sei to learn more about enchanting after Johan's suggests it. However, she runs into problems when her enchantments are too powerful for certain stones, although she eventually succeeds after a silver-haired man helps her. A few weeks later, she is requested to enchant more items, as apparently her enchantments are rare, difficult to create, and incredibly valuable. She gifts Albert with a necklace she enchanted as a thanks for her hairpin.
4	4	"Miracle"; Transliteration: "Kiseki" (Japanese: 奇跡)	Shōta Ihata	Jakuson Ō	April 27, 2021
The mage who taught her enchanting and Johan talk with King Seigfried Salutania regarding Sei's remarkable enchantment--which is apparently of Legendary status--and yet everyone still seems skeptical that she's the true Saint. Sei delivers potions to the Third Order, where she learns they are going on an expedition that will not include the First Order, as they're busy guarding Prince Kyle and the "Saint," Aira Misono, on their training mission. They express their belief that Sei is more "saintly" than Aira. Sei wonders why her magic is more powerful than Aira's and comes to the conclusion that she must actually be the true Saint, much to her chagrin. Later, she meets the King in the library and he apologizes for his son's behavior and attitude toward her when she was first summoned. He insists she be rewarded for what she did for the knights before, although she has no idea what to even ask for, and she begins studying Holy magic. She visits the hospital where the knights who recently returned from their expedition are. She can no longer avoid being the Saint after her healing magic regrows one of the knight's missing hands and heals all other knights in the hospital. When she returns to the Institute, Johan informs her that she'll finally officially be appraised by the Grand Magus to see if she's the true Saint.
5	5	"Appraisal"; Transliteration: "Kantei" (Japanese: 鑑定)	Ageha Kochōran	Jakuson Ō	May 4, 2021
On the way to see the Grand Magus, Johan explains that she and Aira should have been appraised as soon as they arrived in their world, but the Grand Magus used too much of his power summoning them and had been in a coma until just recently. He also tells her of the Saint's traditional duties of following the knights into battle with the darkness/corruption. She expresses her desire to continue living at the Institute even if she is revealed to be the real Saint. She meets the Grand Magus, Yuri Dreves, and learns the mage who taught her enchanting, Erhart, is Albert's older brother. Yuri is unable to appraise her, leading to his conclusion that she must be more powerful than him. Yuri asks her to demonstrate her healing magic, revealing hers to be unique because it releases a golden shimmer. After the meeting is over, Yuri tells the King that he believes Sei is the true Saint, especially since her spells are more powerful than Aira's, produce a golden shimmer unlike Aira's, and Aira's power could actually be appraised. Sometime later, Sei receives an official invitation to attend Court from the King and is visited by Albert, who informs her he's her bodyguard now. At Court, the King publicly apologizes for her initial treatment and insists on rewarding her. Sei is reluctant, as she doesn't really want anything offered, then asks if she can have access to the library's forbidden section, as well as a tutor for magic. Prince Kyle refuses to believe Sei is the true Saint and Yuri becomes her magic tutor.
6	6	"Lady"; Transliteration: "Shukujo" (Japanese: 淑女)	Ageha Kochōran; Shōta Ihata	Jakuson Ō	May 11, 2021
Sei learns the Saint's abilities are state secrets, thus Yuri as the Grand Magus is the best suited to teach her so as few people as possible know about them. He also mentions his personal interest in studying her and her magic, though it seems like Erhart wanted to be her tutor. Yuri confirms her power is unusual, since it's aligned with Holy magic and "something else entirely." His training turns out to be brutal. Sei practices with the knights for practical application and she and Albert share a moment. Sei's casting improves and is praised by Yuri, who tells her why he's training her so hard. Later, Sei has etiquette training with maids at the palace and practices dancing with Albert. Elizabeth invites Sei to a tea party and learns Elizabeth is engaged to Prince Kyle. She also learns Aira is having difficulty adjusting to life there because the social customs are much different than they are in Japan.
7	7	"Interlude"; Transliteration: "Shōkan" (Japanese: 章間)	Shingo Tamaki	Wataru Watari	May 18, 2021
Aira's arrival is shown, showing she was initially very upset at being summoned, especially after she learns she cannot go home. Prince Kyle tries to make her feel better by taking her into town, though it seems like many of the townspeople and knights aren't fond of him because he's too uptight. He does promise to try and find a way to return her to her home after the trouble in the kingdom is resolved, but laments he may not succeed in his search. Aira begins studying at the Royal Academy, but most people appear to avoid her due to their social customs being incompatible with hers. She tries to make more friends but fails, continuing to rely on Prince Kyle and his subordinates for companionship. Kyle admits to his right hand man that he made a mistake in ignoring Sei because of his own pride, but that "changing his mind" at this point is dangerous since it could trigger another succession crisis. However, he is genuinely worried about Aira and the backlash she may face if he rescinds his support of her sainthood. Thus, he decides to continue his "act" of being the "incompetent" prince to keep her safe. Elizabeth tries to befriend Aira after speaking with Sei, but Kyle interrupts and takes Aira away.
8	8	"Awakening"; Transliteration: "Kakusei" (Japanese: 覚醒)	Shōta Ihata	Sō Sagara	May 25, 2021
Sei is finally given access to the forbidden section of the library. Yuri arrives to be nosy and questions her research into poisonous plants. Sei, however, just wants to make better medicines, since the dose makes the poison. Yuri explains that all living things, plants included, have at least trace amounts of magic in them and gives her an idea to imbue the herbs she uses in her potions with magic. While discussing making holy water, Yuri teaches Sei about the rare form of magic strong against all monsters called the Saint's Conjuring, though his answers when Sei asks what it is or how to use it are vague and unhelpful. While thinking about the people she's gotten to know in her new world, she accidentally succeeds in using Saint's Conjuring and imbues some of the plants in the herb garden with magic, which makes it possible for anyone using those enhanced herbs to make potions of the same quality she makes naturally. However, she still cannot cast the spell at will. It's revealed later that Sei will be accompanying the Third Order to the Western Woods, along with Albert and Yuri, the latter of whom wants to know anything and everything about her successful casting of Saint's Conjuring. Fewer beasts show up this time, unlike before when Albert was wounded, and Yuri and Albert think it's due to Sei's presence. However, they eventually run into dense miasma and monsters, including a salamander. Sei is protected from an attack by her enchanted hairpin when it creates an ice wall to shield her. When Albert is wounded, Sei unleashes her saint power and purifies the entire area by accident to save him.
9	9	"Saint"; Transliteration: "Seijo" (Japanese: 聖女)	Ageha Kochōran	Wataru Watari	June 1, 2021
Yuri is thrilled with Sei's display. Albert thanks her on behalf of everyone and people at the palace gossip about her achievements. Johan sympathizes with Sei's desire to be more anonymous but tries to cheer her up by saying going out with the knights would allow her to collect more herbs, thus implying that she can continue to live at the Institute even after being officially recognized as the Saint. She continues having difficulty casting Saint's Conjuring at will. Elizabeth tries to get Kyle to understand that sheltering Aira as he does is only a detriment to her, but Kyle refuses to listen. He continues to call Aira the true Saint and generally makes a fool out of himself. Sei gets dragged into the argument as she and Yuri come upon them. Kyle tries to lay a hand on her for her insolence and is stopped by Albert. The King arrives after Yuri snuck off to fetch him and scolds Kyle in front of a crowd. After he, Kyle, and Elizabeth have a private conversation, the King promises to protect Aira and Kyle acknowledges that he's known Sei is the true Saint for some time. The King places Kyle and his cohorts under house arrest, and Elizabeth commends Kyle for his act after he asks her to look after Aira. Later, Elizabeth, Sei, and Aira have a tea party and get to know each other. With their encouragement, Aira decides to join the Royal Magi Assembly to study magic. Meanwhile, the miasma's corruption is getting worse, especially in the herb-growing region of Klausner's Domain, and Sei is determined to accompany Albert and his knights there.
10	10	"Diary"; Transliteration: "Nikki" (Japanese: 日記)	Shingo Tamaki	Sō Sagara	June 8, 2021
Sei enjoys discussing herbs with Lord Klausner and he introduces her to their top alchemist, an elderly woman named Corrina. They take to each other quickly. She also meets Leonhardt, a mercenary captain, who is very friendly and cares not for formalities. Corrina and Lord Klausner hope Sei can bless their fields, which are currently suffering. When Sei tells Corrina about her wish to create stronger healing potions, she learns there used to be stronger potions but they can't be made anymore, not after the Great Alchemist passed long ago. Corrina gives her the Great Alchemist's journal to read, where Sei learns there was a drought followed by an epidemic during her lifetime, and the Great Alchemist resolved both with her powerful magic--which is shockingly similar to Saint's Conjuring. It is also implied that the key to using this power is love, as it was the Great Alchemist's love for her little brother that allowed her to succeed. Leonhardt's band of mercenaries returns from their mission, many wounded, and after learning the knights ran into trouble on their own scouting mission, Sei heals Leonhardt's men with a powerful Area Heal and rushes off to find them. Believing Albert to be dying when she finds him, she panics and unleashes her Saint's Conjuring, healing everyone in the area, including Albert...who wasn't actually injured at all. Sei realizes she can only cast it when she's thinking about Albert and gets flustered, running away from him. "The Saint's power is that of love itself."
11	11	"Predicament"; Transliteration: "Kyūchi" (Japanese: 窮地)	Shōta Ihata	Wataru Watari	June 15, 2021
Yuri is upset he couldn't follow Sei to Klausner's Domain and takes it out on Erhart. Aira has joined the Assembly as a new recruit and Yuri volunteers to be part of the reinforcements for the Second Order in Klausner to join Sei, ditching his paperwork and angering Erhart. He takes interest in Aira since she and Sei are from the same world. Sei practices Saint's Conjuring, confirming it's only Albert that gets it to work for her. She asks Corrina for help practicing. Leonhardt shows up while she's doing so and begs her to join his merc band until Albert arrives, shutting the idea down, and Leonhardt finally realizes Sei is the Saint. Later, Sei and the knights leave on their expedition into the forest and Leonhardt's band joins them. He and Albert seem to develop a rivalry over Sei. Again, they don't run into many monsters until later, when a slime creature attacks. When it looks like they're backed into a corner, Yuri, Aira, and some other mages arrive and annihilate the slimes.
12	12	"Return"; Transliteration: "Kikan" (Japanese: 帰還)	Shōta Ihata	Wataru Watari	June 22, 2021
Yuri overkills the slimes with Fire Storm while everyone else retreats, and Leonhardt is distressed by the forest's destruction via fire magic. Sei's Saint's Conjuring training with Corrina is successful and she moves on to a larger target, catching Yuri's attention, who hounds her for answers. Then, he and Corrina conspire to experiment with Sei's powers, taking her to a massive field. Saint's Conjuring apparently uses a lot of magic and Sei is eventually exhausted from practice. She manages to avoid telling Yuri that she must think of Albert when she casts it. Aira joins Sei's squad on their next foray into the woods, along with Albert, Yuri, and Leonhardt. Yuri promises to be more careful and not destroy the forest, so he uses weaker fire spells with a smaller area of effect. There are more monsters this time and Albert is injured protecting Sei. They finally locate the miasma swamp, but Sei has trouble conjuring enough power to purify it since she's distracted. Yuri ends up having to use Fire Lance to protect everyone after Sei has a lapse in judgement, however she is eventually successful in purifying the area. Unfortunately, much of the forest is destroyed from the fire. Later that night in camp, Albert pledges his sword to Sei. The next morning, Sei heals the entire forest with her magic with Albert's support, but then collapses after using too much power. Yuri notices how Sei and Albert interact and is intrigued at the implications regarding Saint's Conjuring. She wakes up in Albert's arms as he carries her and is teased by Yuri. Corrina and Leonhardt bid Sei farewell and they all return to the capital.

===== Season 2 (2023) =====
No. overall	No. in season	Title	Directed by	Written by	Original release date
13	1	"The Trading Company"; Transliteration: "Shōkai" (Japanese: 商会)	Shōta Ihata	Shōta Ihata	October 3, 2023
Sei starts her own cosmetics company with Johan's merchant connections. While at a teahouse with Albert, Sei discovers that coffee exists in this world.
14	2	"A Foreign Country"; Transliteration: "Ikoku" (Japanese: 異国)	Ageha Kochōran	Wataru Watari	October 10, 2023
Sei visits the trading port of Morgenhaffen in search of rice in this world. Sei helps Seiran, a trader from Zaidera, with her healing potion. Sei obtains rice, miso and other goods amongst his wares, with which she prepares Japanese food for her friends. Seiran sends a report back home about the potion.
15	3	"The Ceremony"; Transliteration: "Shikiten" (Japanese: 式典)	Shingo Tamaki	Jakuson	October 17, 2023
Sei is invited to the royal palace for a ceremony presenting her as the Saint to the court. Elizabeth introduces Sei to Rain, the second prince of Salutania. Sei attends an evening ball with Albert.
16	4	"The Imperial Prince"; Transliteration: "Oji" (Japanese: 皇子)	Keizō Kusakawa	Sō Sagara	October 24, 2023
Tenyū, a prince of the Empire of Zaidera, arrives as a foreign exchange student. Sei, whose powers are considered a national secret, is kept hidden from Tenyū, but ends up running into him anyway. Tenyū suspects that Sei is the one he is looking for.
17	5	"Purpose"; Transliteration: "Mokuteki" (Japanese: 目的)	Keizō Kusakawa	Sō Sagara	October 31, 2023
Sei meets Tenyū after repeatedly avoiding him, but still hides her true identity. From her conversations with him and investigations into him, Sei deduces that Tenyū is only interested in her high-grade potions, not the Saint's powers. Sei and Albert successfully trick Tenyū into believing that a different alchemist is responsible for the potions. Tenyū shares with Sei that he came to Salutania to find a cure for his mother's illness.
18	6	"Divine Blessing"; Transliteration: "Tenyū" (Japanese: 天佑)	Keizō Kusakawa	Sō Sagara	November 7, 2023
Tenyū reveals that he studied medicine for his mother's sake and that her condition is worsening. Sei suggests a panacea that can cure all ailments, and secretly begins research on it. Sei grows an apple tree with her powers as the Saint and completes the panacea. Tenyū receives the panacea as a gift from the king of Salutania, who claims that it was passed down from a legendary alchemist from long ago. Tenyū returns to Zaidera.
19	7	"Interlude"; Transliteration: "Makuai" (Japanese: 幕間)	Ageha Kochōran	Wataru Watari	November 14, 2023
As the miasma eradication campaign nears its end, the royal court buzzes with talks of Sei's engagement. The Hawkes decide to present Albert as a suitor, while the Valdecs try to convince Johan, who refuses. Sei's friends also discuss the issue with Sei, who remains uncertain.
20	8	"Frontier"; Transliteration: "Henkyō" (Japanese: 辺境)	Ageha Kochōran	Jakuson Ō	November 21, 2023
Sei, Albert and Yuri arrive at the Hawkes' domain on their final eradication mission. Sei meets Albert's parents. The group investigates monster attacks at a mining town, where they encounter the undead led by a giant boar.
21	9	"Final Act"; Transliteration: "Shūmaku" (Japanese: 終幕)	Ageha Kochōran	Shōta Ihata	November 28, 2023
Sei, Albert, Yuri and the knights fight through the undead in the mines. Sei purifies the miasma, but a remaining undead attacks Sei, causing her to fall into a chasm. After a search, Sei is reunited with the group but discovers another lake of miasma, from which an undead dragon emerges. Despite sustaining injuries, Albert and Yuri protect Sei until she successfully casts her spell and purifies the miasma.
22	10	"Longing"; Transliteration: "Shibo" (Japanese: 思慕)	Keizō Kusakawa	Wataru Watari	December 5, 2023
Sei and Albert enjoy their time together at the celebratory banquet, the marketplace and the hot springs villa. Sei contemplates what she wants to do from now and realizes she is in love.
23	11	"Theatergoing"; Transliteration: "Kangeki" (Japanese: 観劇)	Ageha Kochōran	Sagara Sō	December 12, 2023
Yuri invites Sei to an evening play at a theater, where they enjoy talking about magic. Rumor begins to spread about an imminent engagement between Yuri and Sei. Sei's friends suspect that the rumor was circulated by Marquis Dreves to increase his political influence.
24	12	"Blessing"	Ageha Kochōran; Shōta Ihara	Wataru Watari	December 19, 2023
Albert recalls how he first met Sei after she saved his life. Elizabeth informs Sei about the rumors and advises her to act on her feelings. Sei becomes uncomfortable at work and in her magic lessons. Albert takes Sei to the royal gardens and proposes to her in an illuminated field of flowers. Sei begins to glow and takes his hand.

== Reception ==
Reviewing Episode 1 of the first season, the reviewers at Anime News Network gave the series a mixed review, averaging 3 stars out of 5, criticizing the generic setting and rushed pace of the first episode, while praising the quality of the animation, and the potential for story development. The reviewers also noted that while the main character did not get much opportunity for character development in the first episode, her design as an older woman in her twenties, instead of the more common teenage boy, is interesting.

== See also ==
- Sweet Reincarnation — A light novel series with the same illustrator
- The "Hentai" Prince and the Stony Cat. — A light novel series by Sō Sagara, one of the script writers of the anime adaptation
- Cherry Petals Fall Like Teardrops — A video game where Ō Jackson, who is one of the script writers of the anime adaptation, is one of the script writers.
- Navel — Ō Jackson is one of the founders of the company.
