= Diomedéa =

Japanese animation studio

Diomedéa, Inc.
- Native name: 株式会社ディオメディア
- Romanized name: Kabushiki-gaisha Diomedia
- Type: Kabushiki gaisha
- Industry: Japanese animation
- Predecessor: Studio Barcelona
- Founded: November 28, 2007
- Founder: Makoto Kohara
- Headquarters: Sekimachi-Kita, Nerima, Tokyo, Japan
- Key people: Makoto Kohara (CEO); Masakazu Ishikawa (director)
- Number of employees: 60 (2022)
- Divisions: Photography Department (Note: Diomedea Photography Department (ディオメディア撮影部), the studio's compositing department.); Coloring Department (Note: Diomedea Coloring Department (ディオメディア彩色部), the studio's coloring department.); Editing Department (Note: Diomedea Editing Department (ディオメディア編集部), the studio's editing department.)
- Website: www.diomedea.co.jp

Studio Barcelona
- Native name: 株式会社スタジオバルセロナ
- Romanized name: Kabushiki-gaisha Sutajio Baruserona
- Type: Kabushiki gaisha
- Industry: Anime
- Predecessor: Group TAC
- Founded: October 5, 2005
- Founder: Nobuyuki Suga
- Defunct: 2007
- Successor: Diomedéa
- Headquarters: Nerima, Tokyo, Japan
- Key people: Nobuyuki Suga (CEO)

Diomedéa, Inc. (Japanese: 株式会社ディオメディア, Hepburn: Kabushiki-gaisha Diomedia), previously known as Studio Barcelona (Japanese: 有限会社スタジオバルセロナ, Hepburn: Yūgen gaisha Sutajio Baruserona), is a Japanese animation studio located in Nerima, Tokyo, Japan. The company was founded on November 28, 2007, following an earlier foundation of its predecessor Studio Barcelona on October 5, 2005.

== History ==
Studio Barcelona was founded on October 5, 2005, by Nobuyuki Suga following a split from Group TAC. Following unknown circumstances, the company technically went defunct and was recreated as Diomedéa by Makoto Kohara, who was previously an employee of Studio Barcelona, on November 28, 2007. The company's headquarters and much of the staff remained the same following the transition.

Between 2018 and 2020, Diomedéa collaborated with Studio Blanc under the brand name Ezóla. According to director Ryousuke Shibuya, Diomedéa was mainly in charge of the digital side (such as photography/compositing and digital coloring) while Studio Blanc's staff focused on the rest.

== Productions ==
=== Television series ===
| Year | Title | Director(s) | Animation producer(s) | Source | Eps. | Refs. |
|---|---|---|---|---|---|---|
| 2007 | Nanatsuiro Drops | Takashi Yamamoto | Kawai Ueno | Eroge visual novel | 12 | |
| 2007 | Kodomo no Jikan | Eiji Suganuma | Line producer: Akihiro Sekiyama | Manga | 12 | |
| 2008 | Haruka Nogizaka's Secret | Munenori Nawa | | Light novel | 12 | |
| 2009 | Polyphonica Crimson S | Toshimasa Suzuki | Line producer: Nobuhiro Okuhara | Visual novel | 12 | |
| 2009 | Haruka Nogizaka's Secret: Purezza | Munenori Nawa | | Light novel | 12 | |
| 2010 | Squid Girl | Tsutomu Mizushima | Atsushi Urushiyama | Manga | 12 | |
| 2011 | Astarotte no Omocha! | Fumitoshi Oizaki | Kenichi Kobayashi; Yousuke Shiroishi | Manga | 12 | |
| 2011 | Shinryaku!? Ika Musume | Tsutomu Mizushima (chief); Yasutaka Yamamoto | Asushi Urushiyama | Manga | 12 | |
| 2012 | Campione! | Keizō Kusakawa | Kenichirou Yamamoto | Light novel | 13 | |
| 2013 | Problem Children Are Coming from Another World, Aren't They? | Keizō Kusakawa (chief); Yasutaka Yamamoto | Akihiro Sekiyama | Light novel | 10 | |
| 2013 | Gingitsune | Shin Misawa | Makoto Kohara; Akihiro Sekiyama | Manga | 12 | |
| 2013 | Noucome | Takayuki Inagaki | Akihiro Sekiyama | Light novel | 10 | |
| 2014 | Riddle Story of Devil | Keizō Kusakawa | Akihiro Sekiyama | Manga | 12 | |
| 2015 | Cute High Earth Defense Club LOVE! | Shinji Takamatsu | Akihiro Sekiyama | Original work | 12 | |
| 2015 | Kantai Collection | Keizō Kusakawa | Shouta Amano | Online game | 12 | |
| 2015 | Unlimited Fafnir | Keizō Kusakawa (chief); Jun Takahashi | Takeshi Eriguchi | Light novel | 12 | |
| 2015 | World Break: Aria of Curse for a Holy Swordsman | Takayuki Inagaki | Akihiro Sekiyama | Light novel | 12 | |
| 2015 | Sky Wizards Academy | Takayuki Inagaki | Akihiro Sekiyama | Light novel | 12 | |
| 2016 | The Lost Village | Tsutomu Mizushima | Hiroaki Kojima | Original work | 12 | |
| 2016 | Handa-kun | Yoshitaka Koyama | Shouta Amano; Takeshi Eriguchi | Manga | 12 | |
| 2016 | Girlish Number | Shouta Ihata | Shouta Amano | Multi-media project | 12 | |
| 2017 | Fuuka | Keizō Kusakawa | Shouta Amano | Manga | 12 | |
| 2017 | Aho-Girl | Keizō Kusakawa; Shingo Tamaki | Shouta Amano | Manga | 12 | |
| 2017 | Action Heroine Cheer Fruits | Keizō Kusakawa | Shouta Amano | Original work | 12 | |
| 2017 | My Girlfriend Is Shobitch (co-animated with Studio Blanc) | Nobuyoshi Nagayama | Takeshi Eriguchi | Manga | 10 | |
| 2018 | Beatless | Seiji Mizushima | Shouta Amano | Novel | 24 | |
| 2018 | Chio's School Road | Takayuki Inagaki | Takuma Mizukoshi | Manga | 12 | |
| 2019 | Domestic Girlfriend | Shouta Ihata | Shouta Amano | Manga | 12 | |
| 2019–2020 | Ahiru no Sora | Keizō Kusakawa; Shingo Tamaki | Kenjirou Kawando | Manga | 50 | |
| 2021 | The Saint's Magic Power Is Omnipotent | Shouta Ihata | Shouta Amano | Light novel | 12 | |
| 2022 | Futsal Boys!!!!! | Yukina Hiiro | Shouta Amano | Multi-media project | 12 | |
| 2022 | Parallel World Pharmacy | Keizō Kusakawa | Shouta Amano | Light novel | 12 | |
| 2023 | The Magical Revolution of the Reincarnated Princess and the Genius Young Lady | Shingo Tamaki | Mizuki Takeoka | Light novel | 12 | |
| 2023 | Ron Kamonohashi's Forbidden Deductions | Shouta Ihata | Mizuki Takeoka | Manga | 13 | |
| 2023 | The Saint's Magic Power Is Omnipotent 2nd Season | Shouta Ihata | Shouta Amano | Light novel | 12 | |
| 2024 | Ron Kamonohashi's Forbidden Deductions 2nd Season | Shouta Ihata | Mizuki Takeoka | Manga | 13 | |
| 2026 | The Daily Life of a Part-time Torturer | Fumitoshi Oizaki | TBA | Manga | 12 | |
| 2026 | Young Ladies Don't Play Fighting Games | Shouta Ihata | TBA | Manga | 12 | |
| 2026 | Hello, I am a Witch, and My Crush Wants Me to Make a Love Potion! | Keizō Kusakawa | TBA | Light novel | TBA | |

=== Original video animations ===
| Year | Title | Director(s) | Animation producer(s) | Source | Eps. | Refs. |
|---|---|---|---|---|---|---|
| 2006–2008 | Magical Witch Punie-chan | Tsutomu Mizushima | Nobuyuki Suga | Manga | 8 | |
| 2007 | Kodomo no Jikan | Eiji Suganuma | | Manga | 1 | |
| 2009 | Kodomo no Jikan 2 Gakki | Eiji Suganuma | | Manga | 4 | |
| 2011 | Kodomo no Jikan: A Child's Summer Time | Eiji Suganuma | Line producer: Makoto Kohara | Manga | 1 | |
| 2011 | Astarotte no Omocha! EX | Fumitoshi Oizaki | Kenichi Kobayashi; Yousuke Shiroishi | Manga | 1 | |
| 2012 | Haruka Nogizaka's Secret: Finale | Munenori Nawa | Makoto Kohara | Manga | 4 | |
| 2012 | Yumekuri | Hiroyuki Hata | Akihiro Sekiyama | Manga | 1 | |
| 2012–2014 | Shinryaku!! Ika Musume | Tsutomu Mizushima | Akihiro Sekiyama | Manga | 3 | |
| 2013 | Problem Children Are Coming from Another World, Aren't They? | Keizō Kusakawa (chief); Yasutaka Yamamoto | Akihiro Sekiyama | Light novel | 1 | |
| 2014 | Noucome | Takayuki Inagaki | Akihiro Sekiyama | Light novel | 1 | |
| 2014 | Riddle Story of Devil | Keizō Kusakawa | Akihiro Sekiyama | Manga | 1 | |
| 2016 | Sky Wizards Academy | Takayuki Inagaki | Akihiro Sekiyama | Light novel | 1 | |
| 2018 | My Girlfriend is Shobitch (co-animated with Studio Blanc) | Nobuyoshi Nagayama | Takeshi Eriguchi | Light novel | 1 | |

=== Films ===
| Year | Title | Director(s) | Animation producer(s) | Source | Refs. |
|---|---|---|---|---|---|
| 2016 | KanColle: The Movie | Keizō Kusakawa | Shouta Amano | Online game | |

== Notable staff ==
=== Representative staff ===
- Nobuyuki Suga (founder and president of Studio Barcelona)
- Makoto Kohara (founder and president of Diomedéa)
- Masakazu Ishikawa (company director, also animator at the studio since 2007)

=== Animation producers ===
- Akihiro Sekiyama (2007~2008)
- Nobuhiro Okuhara (2007~, also an editor)
- Kenichirou Yamamoto (2010~2012)
- Yousuke Shiroishi (2010~)
- Shouta Amano (2012~present)
- Takuma Mizugochi (2013~2018)
- Hiroaki Kojima (2015~2016)
- Mizuki Takeoka (2015~present)
- Kenjirou Kawando (2017~present, head of production department)

=== Directors ===
- Keizō Kusakawa (2013~present)

== See also ==
- Group TAC—Studio Barcelona (Diomedéa) was originally split from Group TAC.
