= Campione! =

Japanese light novel series

- First light novel cover, featuring Yuri Mariya (left) and Erica Blandelli (right)

カンピオーネ! (Kanpiōne!)
- Genre: Fantasy; Harem; Romantic comedy
- Light novel
- Written by: Jō Taketsuki
- Illustrated by: Sikorsky
- Published by: Shueisha
- Imprint: Super Dash Bunko (2008–2014); Dash X Bunko (2015–2017)
- Original run: May 28, 2008 – November 22, 2017
- Volumes: 21
- Manga
- Written by: Jō Taketsuki
- Illustrated by: Jirō Sakamoto
- Published by: Shueisha
- Magazine: Super Dash & Go!
- Original run: October 2011 – April 2013
- Volumes: 3
- Anime television series
- Directed by: Keizō Kusakawa
- Written by: Jukki Hanada
- Music by: Tatsuya Kato
- Studio: Diomedéa
- Licensed by: AUS: Hanabee; NA: Sentai Filmworks; UK: MVM Films
- Original network: AT-X, Tokyo MX, Sun TV, TV Aichi, BS11
- Original run: July 6, 2012 – September 28, 2012
- Episodes: 13

Campione! (Italian for 'Champion!') (カンピオーネ!, Kanpiōne!) is a Japanese light novel series written by Jō Taketsuki and illustrated by Sikorsky. 21 volumes were published by Shueisha from May 2008 to November 2017, first under their Super Dash Bunko imprint (which was abolished in 2014) and then under their Dash X Bunko imprint since.

It has been adapted into a manga series published in Shueisha's Super Dash & Go!. A 13-episode anime television series, produced by Diomedéa aired on AT-X and Tokyo MX from July to September 2012. Sentai Filmworks released an English dub of the TV series in North America. The novel's story focuses on Godou Kusanagi, a former middle school baseball player who was forced to retire due to injury, as he becomes a Campione after killing the god of war, Verethragna. Hanabee Entertainment later licensed the series in 2014. There is a sequel titled Campione! Lord of Realms (カンピオーネ！ ロード・オブ・レルムズ), and a spin-off based on it, Shiniki no Campiones (神域のカンピオーネス)

== Plot ==
Godou Kusanagi, a former middle school baseball player who had to retire due to injury, is asked by his grandfather to return a stone tablet to a friend in Sardinia named Lucrezia Zora. After meeting the demonically manipulative sword-mistress Erica Blandelli, he encounters the god of war, Verethragna. After killing the god, Godou becomes a Campione, or god slayer. His duty is to fight heretical gods who start changing things to suit themselves, usually at the expense of the people in the area. One of the problems associated with being a Campione, is that his status keeps attracting attention and difficult girls. Erica, who strongly professes her love for him, usually creates awkward and misunderstood situations for him in particular. Every time he fights a god, he kisses one of the girls he has brought with him.

== Characters ==
=== Main characters (Round Table Alliance) ===
Godou Kusanagi (草薙 護堂, Kusanagi Godō)
Voiced by: Yoshitsugu Matsuoka (Japanese); Blake Shepard (English)
Godou is the main protagonist of the series and is the 7th Campione. He is a retired middle school baseball player (wild pitch injured and weakened right shoulder), after his grandfather asked him to return a stone tablet in Sardinia to Lucrezia Zora. Upon his encounter with Erica Blandelli, he manages to slay the god Verethragna, a Persian god of Victory. After obtaining Verethragna's Golden Sword and becoming a Campione, Godou obtains the abilities of Verethragna's ten incarnations: Gale (wind), Bull (strength), White Stallion (sun), Camel (leg strength), Boar (trample), Youth (divine protection), Raptor (speed), Ram (resurrection), Goat (thunder), and Warrior (Golden Sword). The Golden Sword allows Godou to seal the authority of a god, only if he accomplish the condition of using the power which is to have substantial knowledge about his enemy. He receives the information via kissing one of the female protagonists, which is the only way to infuse the information into a Campione due to their incredible magic resistance. This and ingestion are the only ways someone can have their magic, benign or malign, bypass a majority of the resistance. He is a little afraid of women due to being completely dense to their feelings, numerous interrogations and punishments from his sister, along with Erica's pranks and occasional blackmail. He tends to take what people say at face value, missing their intentions.
Erica Blandelli (エリカ・ブランデッリ, Erika Buranderri)
Voiced by: Yōko Hikasa (Japanese); Monica Rial (English)
Erica is an Italian girl who is member of the Copper Black Cross (赤銅黒十字, Shakudō Kuro Jūji), one of the European magic organizations that inherited secret rites from the Knights Templar and is based in Milan, Italy. Their battle tactics and colors (red and black) has likened them to that of red devils. Holding the rank of Great Knight and the title of Diavolo Rosso (Red Devil), she is a magic swordsman that through coincidence meets Godou and assists him while he was in Sardinia, Italy. She ends up falling in love with him. She uses her weapon Cuore di Leone (Heart of Lion), an enchanted sword that she can summon to her hand. She also has the ability to use the sword to summon a large silver lion which can attack in place of Erica in the anime. Her weapon can transform into a spear, lance or sword for offense, or simply a shield for defense. Its true form is that of a long, silvery, broadsword infused with the spell words of David which she must cast, giving it the ability to harm gods. She is able to multiply the Cuore di Leone, even after throwing it, or in its lion form. Whether there is a restriction on how many duplicates she can make, due to ability or power, is unknown but so far has made up to thirteen lions and seven spears. Her lions are infused with intelligence allowing them to act independently just like real lions, but under her control. Although she fares well against Liliana Kranjčar in martial arts as a knight, her magic expertise excels Liliana's and can be even be considered unrivaled in the areas of iron alchemy, fire, creation, transformation, destruction and reinforcement spells. Erica can use leap magic, able to boost jumping while in midair. She is an Italian girl who likes to keep herself in control of her own situation, thus she can be very forceful in her affection and jealousy. However, she knows her own limitations to be able to help and protect Godou, and she is willing to be open-minded enough to allow the other girls to become additional "wives", although she is to be recognized as his number one wife.
Yuri Mariya (万里谷 祐理, Mariya Yuri)
Voiced by: Kana Hanazawa (Japanese); Hilary Haag (English)
Yuri is a dark-haired Hime-Miko (princess shrine maiden) under Musashino, an organization whose duty is to protect Kanto, handling the greatest tasks and responsibilities. She is subject to the authority of The Committee for the Compilation of True History, a Japanese government based magic organization, who aims to use Godou to protect Japan while minimizing his potential as a threat. She is initially quite harsh on Godou due to the misunderstanding that Godou is doing something lecherous, but mostly she is kind with him, and is endured by Godou as he sees the self-sacrifice that lies behind it. Often called a Yamato nadeshiko, Yuri is clairvoyant and uses magic to heal and send knowledge to Godou. In terms of fighting level and physical stamina, she is the weakest, shown when playing sports, but excels at support and is unrivaled at information gathering. She is an excellent cook in both taste and visual appeal, and the head of the Tea Ceremony Club that Godōu's little sister Shizuka Kusanagi is a member of. Like Erica, she falls in love with Godou when she sees how willing he is to put his all to protect others. Yuri gets upset when she sees Godou with one of the other girls, (which she misinterprets as flirting), or extremely serious she unknowingly smiles while giving off an extremely cold presence like a yaksha.
Liliana Kranjčar (リリアナ・クラニチャール, Ririana Kuranicharu)
Voiced by: Eri Kitamura (Japanese); Genevieve Simmons (English)
Liliana is the Croatian childhood friend of Erica and belongs to the organization Bronze Black Cross (青銅黒十字, Seidō Kuro Jūji) which is a mage/knight organization similar to, yet occasionally working but usually competing with, the Copper Black Cross. The organization serves the Campione Salvatore Doni, although her grandfather and some other members favor and support the Campione Sasha Dejanstahl Voban by preference. The Bronze Black Cross are referred to as blue berserkers. Liliana has been also been called the Sword Fairy and Blue Witch, although these seem to be more nicknames as she is rarely called either while Erica is called or calls herself Diavolo Rosso often. She possesses the sword Il Maestro, able to fight with great speed, excellent magic, and flying attacks similar to that of a falcon. When released, takes on its true appearance of a naginata, which releases spell melodies when swung that can disrupt the concentration of even the toughest of opponents, although since magic in nature it has limit, if any effect, on Campiones or gods. However, in naginata form the spell words of David are infused into it as well giving it the ability to harm gods. She is often compared to be on equal footing to Erica in both martial skills and combat, as well as known by people to be among the top of the current generation of Great Knights. However, due to her direct and upfront nature, she does not have the political acumen Erica possesses and is more gullible to Erica and Karen's pranks. She is also in love with Godou, but does her best to hide it from others. Usually covering up her desire to be in close proximity or help Godou with claims of merely serving her role as a knight or bodyguard. She is a silver-haired girl with a svelte body. Though she lacks the well-curved, voluptuous figure Erica possesses, her beauty is more along that of an ephemeral, delicate fairy. She is great at housework and cooking, is a descendant of witches, and has the hobby of writing embarrassing romantic novels. Her expertise over Erica is in flight magic, witchcraft, potions, communicating with plants and animals, and spells relating to water, earth, and sky. This allows her to make flying attacks similar to a sparrow, but with the ability to halt in midair, unaffected by gravity, before continuing her attack. This also gives her the ability to swim through water as easily as a fish, harvest herbs, cast hard spells and create difficult potions. She proved invaluable in not only opening a gate to the astral realm to rescue Godou and Erica, but the knowledge to create the potion required to be unaffected by the astral realm's environment. She can also summon and use the Bow of Jonathon, which is powerful enough to harm gods, such as Perseus. Although it appears she shoots four arrows at a time, only one is real, the others are illusions to increase the chances of the real arrow hitting.
Ena Seishuin (青洲院 恵那, Seishūin Ena)
Voiced by: Yuka Saitō (Japanese); Carli Mosier (English)
Ena is a girl with long, shiny, black hair with red eyes. She is a Hime Miko as well as a Yamato nadeshiko but with a figure similar to Erica's. She is the strongest of all Japan's Hime Miko, being specially trained by Susanoo. She is aggressive, impulsive, and has a tendency to ignore complicated things. Due to the harsh training she endured, Ena lacks a bit of common sense in everyday life, but this has made her an unpredictable fighter as she relies on instinct. She possesses the sword Ama no Murakumo no Tsurugi and can draw power from it, becoming possessed in the process. However, she can only do this for short periods before her body starts taking damage. Also, if she takes in too much power, there's a chance of Susanoo's instincts or Ama no Murakumo taking control of her and running amok. When this happens she can fight on par with Campiones and gods alike. Erica considers her a threat to her position with Godou, due to Ena being another harem member with both a strong personality and a voluptuous, curvy figure; Liliana and Yuri are more submissive and easier for Erica to either manipulate or dominate. Erica believes that Ena can get close to Godou as a "guy" with her forthright nature before showing some feminine charm as a "girl". Due to isolation from society during her training, Ena is not very experienced with relationships in general. Although her mission was to seduce Godou, she knew that he was her soulmate the instant she saw him and has completely fallen for him to the point that she is willing to be his mistress as long as she can be with him. She misunderstands his wanting to develop their relationship slowly as well as his desire to become a man good enough for her as signs that she is not good enough to be his wife, which frustrates Godou as much as Erica's wild antics do.

=== Campiones ===
Campione, or God Slayers, are humans who have obtain the abilities of the first slain god called Authorities. They have enhanced bodies that can heal from even mortal wounds much faster and magic abilities which exceed that of the most powerful mages. They also have very high magic immunity which protects them from mortal enemy magic, but also prevents them from receiving beneficial magic such as teaching or healing. Thus, a caster has to deliver the spells internally through methods such as kissing or ingestion. The number of the Campiones are in chronological from when they first appeared, not a reference to power level or actual age.

Sasha Dejanstahl Voban (サーシャ·デヤンスタール·ウォバン, Sāsha Deyansutāru Voban)
Voiced by: Unshō Ishizuka (Japanese); John Swasey (English)
Voban is the 1st Campione and of Hungarian descent. He is a cold man whose only desire is to battle worthy opponents and obtaining abilities. His normal appearance is that of a healthy and athletic old man with gray hair. His true form is the appearance of a huge werewolf. Voban is the oldest of the Campiones, as he has defeated and usurped the authorities of Apollo and Osiris. He has the abilities to create severe storms, summon swarms of dire wolves, swallow sun-based attacks, turning people into salt with his eyes and summon the bodies of those he has killed to serve him.
Luo Hao (羅濠, Ruo Hao)
Luo Hao is the 2nd Campione and of Chinese descent. She was a great figure who carried herself with royal splendor. She possess the full set of the five Confucian virtues: benevolence, righteousness, propriety, knowledge and integrity. She was seeking a worthy opponent who could defeat her just like Verethragna had before Godou met her. Also, she believes her valor to be the greatest in the world, she places greater value on herself than anyone else on the Earth and is undecided on whether humanity is worth saving or not. Despite all this, Luo Hao is very observant of formality and propriety, as well as the rules of etiquette. She is able to control flowers, albeit harmless, poisonous or dangerous. With over two hundred years experience she has mastered Daoist arts which allows her to use techniques similar to European magic spells. Another ability is changing herself to a small lizard, although whether it is an Authority or a Daoist art is unknown.
Aisha (アイーシャ, Aīsha)
Aisha is the 3rd Campione and of Alexandrian descent. She has the nicknames the Eternal Beauty, Goddess of Caves or Mysterious Queen of Caves, which refers to her ability to create a hole to another world and has the appearance of a cave. She is a beautiful maiden with black hair and olive skin, having the personality of a wanderer. The Authorities she possess do not have any combat potential, however one of the Authorities she received from Persephone allows her to share the energy of life with living things which heals even severe wounds. Although, if she has a day to prep she can flip the Authority's "spring side" into the "winter side", which can remove life, but Godou stopped her from actually using it the time she considered it. Another she usurped from a certain Catholic saint in the Catholic religion causes everyone to like her which helps keep her out of trouble in areas where the locals ostracize or treat strangers with hostility. Although if she does not keep the effect toned down or inspires a group of defenders too often then she could unintentionally create a cult that would lay down their lives for her. This is considered a most troublesome Authority by Saint Raffaello in that most of the holes link to the past. This is a problem in that any changes in the past could affect the future similar to the butterfly effect. The main problem with this Authority is that she has no control over what time period the holes open up to, and the holes appearing and sucking her in whenever she forgets about having the Authority. Also, the connection in time is not stable so someone entering the hole a few minutes earlier or later than another person will still arrive at the same spot, but days or years before or after the other.
Annie Charlton (アニー·チャールトン, Anī Chāruton)
Annie is the 4th Campion and of American descent. She also goes by the masked identity of John Pluto Smith. A serious minded individual, she only lets her feelings show when she is drunk. When in the armored form of John Pluto Smith, she acts much more relaxed and flamboyant. At some point the Smith persona turned into a semi-split personality, which seems to express all the emotions and stuff Annie has been heavily suppressing. So Annie and Smith are aware and know everything the other personality experiences, but thoughts and actions reflect whichever one is out. She starts to grow feelings toward Godou after fighting alongside him and Luo Hao, although she denies to herself due to the difference between their ages and Godou's reputation of being a playboy. Has usurped the Authorities of Tezcatlipoca, which requires sacrificing sources to temporarily transform into a jaguar, and Artemis, which automatically reloads arrows in a large, six-shooter revolver. Annie wears dark leather suits, rectangular half-glasses, with short fiery red hair. John Pluto Smith wears various cloths that present the proper atmosphere of a hero over armor that makes her look like an insect, primarily the helmet, and hides the fact that Smith is a woman.
Alexander Gascoigne (アレクサンダー·ガスコイン, Arekusandā Gasukoin)
Alexander is the 5th Campione and of British descent. He is also known as Black Prince Alec, leader of political organization Royal Arsenal that oppose Princess Alice's organization Witengamot. He looks like a young man with black hair. He has an arrogant personality, willing to work with Alice when their goals align on issues. He has the Authority of Fallen Angel Ramiel "Black Lightning," an ability that grants him super speed. He can also turn himself into a lightning avatar made of plasma to travel even faster, evade physical injury and use lightning strikes. However, if the lightning avatar is dispelled, he will revert to his normal physical form. He also defeated the Minotaur Granting, which creates an underground labyrinth where he always understands the full layout and where his opponents are located, and the three Judging Furies, which returns all damage done in front of him back to an opponent using any physical or magical form of destructive power.
Salvatore Doni (サルヴァトーレ·ドニ, Saruvatōre Doni)
Voiced by: Takuya Eguchi (Japanese); Andrew Love (English)
Salvatore is the 6th Campione and of Italian descent. He has blonde hair and has a scar going around his right shoulder where it meets the arm He has a carefree personality, considered by most to be a complete idiot with no common sense and lacks magical skills. He is on equal levels with Godou Kusanagi as a Campione, as they had a draw on their fight. Salvatore is also notably hated or strongly disliked by the Campione Sasha Dejanstahl Voban, for stealing his prey that he had summoned specifically to relieve boredom. He is feared for all the trouble his antics causes and his utter lack of understanding and caring about serious issues, as he believes his scabbard is the solution to every issue. He does not see Godou as a friend or an ally, but an adversary. He therefore anticipated for a rematch, warning Godou about Voban entering Japan as an excuse for Godou to grow stronger and faster. He is a former Templar candidate, but failed due to abysmally poor magic scores and ability well below that of a young novice who never heard of magic before. He is considered an exceptional prodigy with swords and always carries one around with him wherever he goes just in case he gets into an interesting fight. The Copper Black Cross answers to him since his home base coincides with their headquarters. He has usurped three Authorities from the king of the Tuatha Dé Danann. Nuadha (Ripping Arm of Silver) allows him to turn his arm silver and gaining the ability to cut through anything. Nordic hero Siegfried (Man of Steel) provides a body of steel that cannot be damaged but increases his mass in proportion to how strong the protection is. Vulcan (Return to Medieval Style) reduces the technology level of an area to that of the Middle Ages for about half a day. His fourth Authority he usurped from Dionysus, which causes all magical powers to overload, activate and run out of control. His creed and spell words is that he will not allow anything to exist in the world that he can not cut.
Uldin (ウルディン, Urudin)
Uldin is the 8th Campione and of Hunnic descent. He is a warrior, who is compared to Godou, due to similarities in personalities and fighting temperaments, possibly due to being an unrecorded and distant ancestor. He has a habit of acting on his impulses and therefore has a harem of women spread throughout the world, although he is apparently married to four of them, with Ruska (first wife) and Clotilde (fourth wife) making their appearance along with Uldin. His other two wives are at two other fortresses he controls. As with the time period feels that if he likes a woman it is okay to carry her off as she will eventually fall for him like the others anyway. His primary Authority that is used is Dragon Tamer, which allows him to control the dragons that he keeps in the forest near his castle. He also can turn dragon bones into an army of smaller skeleton dragons similar to the story of sowing teeth of dragons into the ground to raise an army. He is also known as Tyr's Sword due to having Authority of Tyr, which allows him to temporarily resurrect his army of dragons to fight again.

=== Heretic Gods ===
Heretic Gods, or Rogue Gods, are gods that come to exist in real world, rather than staying as myths. A human who weakens and killed a Heretic God single-handedly will gain their abilities and become a Campione, while Campiones can also kill other Heretic Gods single-handedly to gain more abilities. Killing a Heretic God who is already weakened by someone else or cooperating with other people during the fight to kill them will not receive any ability. Note that even if killed, Heretic Gods will resurrect later as long as the myth is still known among humans.

Athena (アテナ, Atena)
Voiced by: Yui Ogura (Japanese); Brittney Karbowski (English)
Athena has a cold personality and seems willing to do anything to reclaim her lost powers. Her appearance is that of a young teenager with silver hair and black eyes similar to those of an owl. After using the Gorgoneion to transform herself into true her goddess, she was defeated by Godou Kusanagi and Erica Blandelli, returning to her youth form. She later returns to help Godou by offering information to defeat Perseus. In exchange for her assistance, Godou had to promise her that he would fulfill any one wish. It is stated that she lost her age and rank before becoming a Heretic God, so her young form appears to be a punishment of some kind. While she claims that she does not want anyone else to defeat Godou but her, she does seem to have taken an interest in Godou's growth and development. It is possible that, like Erica and the others, having watched and interacted with him she has started to develop feelings for him that she is not aware of or willing to admit to herself. This is shown when she sought his help after losing her memories. When she talked with Shizuka Kusanagi, it is hinted that her feelings towards Godou might be affectionate.
Verethragna (ウルスラグナ, Urusuraguna)
Voiced by: Junko Minagawa (Japanese); Leraldo Anzaldua (English)
Verethragna is an ancient Persian warlord who likes to fight and will do anything to challenge a worthy opponent. He has defeated nine other warlords and inherited their abilities. He meets Godou in the form of the Youth, but he does not remember his name or that he is a god. After seeing that Godou possess the grimoire based on the Book of Prometheus, he flees. After recovering his divinity, he forgets that Godou has the grimoire. When Verethragna attacks in Sardinia, Godou uses the grimoire to steal Verethrana's incarnation of the Horse. After being defeated, his powers were usurped by Godou, who thereby became a Campione. Being joyful at finally being defeated, he blesses Godou before passing on, along with a stern command not to fall to anyone else before their rematch.
Perseus (ペルセウス, Peruseusu)
Voiced by: Nobutoshi Canna (Japanese); Chris Patton (English)
Perseus masquerades himself as a Greek hero, but he is actually the Persian god Mithra. He is known as the Legendary Dragon Killer, slaying any dragon he encounters but disregarding the consequences that come from killing the dragons. He possesses the Heroic Steel, being known in many myths worn to conquer dragons, which was use in rescuing and marrying any maiden in distress, allowing him to dominate and control any descendant of those goddesses and priestesses, as shown when he enthralled Liliana Kranjcar before Godou managed to break the spell since she loved him. Godou defeated him during the battle in a coliseum in front of an audience. Perseus was consumed by a shadowy figure, later recognized as Metis.
Pandora (パンドラ)
Voiced by: Yuiko Tatsumi (Japanese); Sasha Paysinger (English)
Pandora, known to be the mother of all Campiones, appears twice in Godou's dreams when he is in the border between life and death after the Ram activated. She provides information, criticism, pep talks or even just small talk with any of the Campiones who either have just become a Campione, or died but have not yet revived through their Authorities. However, until the Campione reaches some level in an unknown aspect, most of the talk will be forgotten with only the subconscious remembering anything.

=== Secondary characters ===
Lucrezia Zora (ルクレシア·ゾラ, Rukureshia Zora)
Voiced by: Atsuko Tanaka (Japanese); Maggie Flecknoe (English)
She is a powerful witch whom Godou Kusanagi meets when returning a grimoire based on the Book of Prometheus in place of his grandfather, who had promised his departed wife to never meet with Lucrezia again. She attended college with and befriended Godou's grandfather, but she is able to retain the appearance of a young woman due to her high magic ability and talent. She has long, flaxen hair and voluptuous body and lives on the island of Sardinia. While living away from major cities she makes sure to have modern conveniences such as a refrigerator, air conditioning, and a computer with internet access. Lucretia is very knowledgeable about gods and magic, and also shares the same disposition with Erica Blandelli for always choosing the more interesting course of action and flirt with Godou. Deciding it would be more interesting, and keep Erica from blindly charging forth with it, Lucrezia returned the grimoire to Godou to help him deal make an alliance with a Heretic God named Melqart to defeat Verethragna to become a Campione.
Arianna Hayama Arialdi (アリアンナ・ハヤマ・アリアルディ, Arianna Hayama Ariarudi)
Voiced by: Sachika Misawa (Japanese); Juliet Simmons (English)
Arianna is Erica's personal maid, chosen by her master due to her possessing interesting aspects. She has black hair and black eyes constantly wears a maid outfit, but she wears only a apron when wearing a swimsuit. Although smart, responsible and hardworking, she has a few flaws. She has extremely dangerous driving habits, her cooking is on a level to be found in any fancy restaurant, but any meals she cooks with a pot are considered awful. She has no martial or magic ability at all. While otherwise perfect, she will make a single unintentional major mistake every three days like clockwork.
Karen Jankulovski (カレン・ヤンクロフスキ, Karen Yankurofusuki)
Voiced by: Kanami Satō (Japanese); Allison Sumrall (English)
Karen is Liliana's personal maid from North Macedonia, who notices Liliana's feeling toward Godou and often gives her advice as a push, as well as making fun of her master. She has short green hair and constantly wears a maid outfit unless meeting Erica in secret. She secretly sells copies of Liliana's romance novels. Karen is someone Erica feels is good to have a long term relationship with, as she considers selling privileged information on the Bronze Black Cross as too risky and thus is less likely to get caught from overextending herself. Although she appears to be a teenager, she has already learned and finished equivalency exams equal to that of a college degree. She is apprenticed to and learning how to be a witch from Liliana. She also occasionally takes bribes from Liliana's grandfather to get Liliana to dress and act more sexily and less strictly.
Shizuka Kusanagi (草薙 静花, Kusanagi Shizuka)
Voiced by: Rina Hidaka (Japanese); Luci Christian (English)
Shizuka is Godou's younger sister, who has short brown hair. She is a strong-willed girl who is suspicious about her brother's actions and fears that he has inherited their grandfather's lady-killer ways. Shizuka is aware of a multitude of girls, especially several of her friends, being fond of him but refuses to enlighten him about it. She worries that one day Godou will not only realize his extreme talent at attracting the love and affection of women, but will come to abuse it. Like Yuri Mariya, Shizuka often criticizes Godou, but it is a front for her concern for her brother. Since Godou's high school and her middle school are part of the same school complex, she is a member of the same tea ceremony club that Yuri belongs to. Shizuka is jealous of all the attention Godou receives from Erica.
Hikari Mariya (ひかりまりや, Mariya Hikari)
Voiced by: Ai Kakuma (Japanese); Meg McDonald (English)
Hikari is Yuri's younger sister, who is Hime-Miko at the apprentice level. She, like her sister, is stated to be a descendant of a Divine Ancestor, a former Mother Goddess defeated and cast down from her divinity. She used Yuri's cellphone to call Godou in order to get help from him to put off a young man who was relentlessly trying to recruit her to being the Hime-Miko of the temple under his guardianship. She revealed he was of a high ranking family so she could not simply tell him no, she needed the aide of someone whom even a member of one of the Four Families could not ignore or override. After a bit of talking, they are convinced to take a look and see what Hikari would be getting into, and go to visit the Monkey King that is sealed within the temple. Once there, meeting the Monkey King, they were attacked by the Campione Luo Hao, who wishes to fight and defeat the Monkey King, and forces Hikari to start unsealing the Monkey King using the sword Zanryuuto. After a short battle, Hikari, Yuri, and Godou escape into another part of the Netherworld and eventually return to the surface with the help of Godou's Wind Authority. Hikari has the rare power of Disaster Purification, which allows her to cancel and negate magical effects and powers. This ability will not work to the full extent on the Authorities of Campione or Heretic Gods, though it can diminish their power slightly. She has a huge crush on Godou as she stated that she will follow him like Erica and the others.

== Media ==
=== Light novel ===
The first volume of Campione! was published on May 28, 2008. The series ended with the release of the 21st volume on November 22, 2017.

No.	Title	Release date	ISBN
01	Heretic God (神はまつろわず, Kami Wa Matsurowazu)	May 28, 2008	978-4-0863-0428-3
02	Arrival of a Devil King (魔王来臨, Maou Rairin)	November 26, 2008	978-4-0863-0460-3
03	Tale of the Beginning (はじまりの物語, Hajimari no Monogatari)	March 30, 2009	978-4-0863-0481-8
04	The Hero and The King (英雄と王, Eiyuu to Ou)	July 29, 2009	978-4-0863-0496-2
05	Miko of the Sword (剣の巫女, Tsurugi no Miko)	November 30, 2009	978-4-0863-0516-7
06	Flying Phoenix of Divine Mountain (神山飛鳳, Shinzan Hihō)	March 30, 2010	978-4-0863-0539-6
07	Great Sage Equaling Heaven (斉天大聖, Seiten Taisei)	July 28, 2010	978-4-0863-0557-0
08	Trials of the Devil Kings (受難の魔王たち, Junan no Maoutachi)	November 30, 2010	978-4-0863-0579-2
09	Return of the Goddess (女神再び, Megami Futatabi)	March 25, 2011	978-4-0863-0600-3
10	War God of the Lance (槍の戦神, Yari no Senjin)	August 30, 2011	978-4-0863-0623-2
11	The Second Tale (ふたつめの物語, Futatsume no Monogatari)	December 27, 2011	978-4-0863-0653-9
12	Transient Holy Night (かりそめの聖夜, Karisome no Seiya)	May 25, 2012	978-4-0863-0677-5
13	Princess Goddess of the Southern Seas (南洋の姫神, Nan'yo no Himegami)	August 24, 2012	978-4-0863-0697-3
14	The Eighth Godslayer (八人目の神殺し, Hachi Ninme no Kamigoroshi)	May 24, 2013	978-4-0863-0738-3
15	Son of the Goddess (女神の息子, Megami no Musuko)	October 25, 2013	978-4-0863-0757-4
16	The Stirring of Heroes (英雄たちの鼓動, Eiyuu-tachi no Kodou)	February 25, 2014	978-4-0863-0772-7
17	The Hero's Name (英雄の名, Eiyuu no Na)	September 25, 2014	978-4-0863-0800-7
18	Unfinished Stories of the Devil Kings (魔王たちの断章, Maotachi no Danshō)	April 24, 2015	978-4-0863-1039-0
19	Civil War of the Devil Kings (魔王内戦, Maō Naisen)	October 25, 2016	978-4-0863-1147-2
20	Civil War of the Devil Kings 2 (魔王内戦2, Maō Naisen 2)	December 22, 2016	978-4-0863-1162-5
21	The Final Battle (最後の戦い, Saigo no Tatakai)	November 22, 2017	978-4-08-631215-8

=== Manga ===
A manga adaptation illustrated by Jirō Sakamoto was serialized from the inaugural October 2011 issue of Shueisha's Super Dash & Go! to the magazine's final April 2013 issue, and was compiled into three volumes.

=== Anime ===
A 13-episode anime adaptation produced by Diomedéa and directed by Keizo Kusakawa aired in Japan on AT-X from July 6 to September 28, 2012 and has been licensed in North America by Sentai Filmworks. The anime adapts the first five volumes of the light novels, with the final episode being a self-contained story. The opening theme song is "BRAVE BLADE!" by Megu Sakuragawa and the closing theme song is "Raise" by Yui Ogura.

==== Episodes ====
No.	Title	Original release date
1	"Tale of the Beginning"; Transliteration: "Hajimari no Monogatari" (Japanese: はじまりの物語)	July 6, 2012; June 29, 2012 (Pre-airing)
In Sardinia, Godou Kusanagi plans to return a stone tablet entrusted by his grandfather back to its former owner named Lucrezia Zora. However, Erica Blandelli, a knight of the Copper Black Cross, threatens him to hand over the stone tablet, calling it a grimoire. When a boar is summoned by a rogue god named Verethragna, Erica fights it. Attempting to find Erica, Godou runs into Verethragna, who flees after Godou explains that he is delivering the grimoire to someone. Although Erica is unable to stop the boar in time, Godou rescues her before the boar disappears. Erica later discovers that Godou is delivering the grimoire to Lucrezia, and Erica's maid Arianna Hayama Arialdi accompanies them to Lucrezia's house. While there, Lucrezia reveals that the grimoire is based on the book of Prometheus, telling Godou to look after it. The next day, Godou and Erica encounter another rogue god named Melqart. Having learned of the ten incarnations from the grimoire, Godou asks Melqart to form an alliance against Verethragna. Using the grimoire, Godou steals Verethragna's golden sword. After kissing Erica, Godou kills Verethragna using the Warrior, therefore becoming a god slayer known as a Campione.
2	"The Landscape with a King"; Transliteration: "Ōsama no iru Fūkei" (Japanese: 王様のいる風景)	July 13, 2012
Godou has a dream of meeting Pandora, mother of all Campiones, who hereby dubs him a Campione. Godou realizes that Erica has moved to Japan, much to the dismay of his younger sister Shizuka Kusanagi. Erica transfers to Godou's school, causing him troubles on her first day. In a botched attempt to escape the mayhem she sets off, Godou meets a princess shrine maiden named Yuri Mariya and learns from Touma Amakasu, a member of The Committee for the Compilation of True History, a magic organization based in Japan, about the possibility of Erica seducing him into joining the Copper Black Cross. Erica brings Godou to Rome upon request to meet the representatives of The Magician Society and shows them his new powers by facing him in a duel. The representatives decides to entrust Godou with a round grimoire upon seeing his abilities. Godou also finds out that Erica chose to be with him out of true love, not by orders from her superiors.
3	"From Afar, An Enemy Comes"; Transliteration: "Enpō Yori Teki Kitaru" (Japanese: 遠方より敵来たる)	July 20, 2012
Yuri is tasked by Amakasu to verify that a round grimoire called the Gorgoneion has been brought to Japan by Godou. After Godou unknowingly gives the Gorgoneion to Yuri, she lectures him, explaining to him that the prophecy of Princess Alice foretells the Gorgoneion bringing about the end of the world known as the Starless Night if obtained by the rogue goddess Athena. Upon hearing this, Godou and Erica set out to find and stop Athena to buy enough time for Yuri to seal the Gorgoneion. Unfortunately, Athena kisses Godou as an unexpected move to take him out, forcing Erica to fight back but to no avail. Yuri, on the other hand, is approached by a girl named Liliana Kranjcar, a knight of the Bronze Black Cross, who has come to take the Gorgoneion. As Amakasu arrives to rescue Yuri from Liliana, Godou wakes up to Erica, who tells him that Athena has gone after the Gorgoneion. Erica kisses Godou in order to transfer information about the origin of the Gorgoneion.
4	"Rogue Athena"; Transliteration: "Matsurowanu Atena" (Japanese: まつろわぬアテナ)	July 27, 2012
As Godou and Erica are on their way, Yuri tries to seal the Gorgoneion at a shrine. However, Athena gets to her first. Although Liliana comes to aide Yuri, Athena easily acquires the Gorgoneion and transforms herself into her goddess form. Yuri absorbs the Wind of Death released from Athena during the transformation. As Yuri attempts a long shot to turn the tide, Godou arrives in time to heal Yuri and face Athena once more. Before Godou confronts Athena, Erica gives him the key to victory via a kiss. During the battle, Godou brings up the story of the Gorgoneion, exposing Athena's weaknesses. The battle ends when Erica gives Godou a lance to pierce through Athena, returning her back to her youth form and allowing her to leave in defeat. The next day, Godou faces Yuri's wrath for his latest and extremely misinterpreted indiscretions.
5	"Unpleasant Days"; Transliteration: "Kōjitsu Narazaru Hibi" (Japanese: 好日ならざる日々)	August 3, 2012
Yuri wakes up from a vision she had about Liliana discussing plans with a Campione named Sasha Dejanstahl Voban with a sinister expression, but keeps it to herself hoping it was a dream and not a vision. Yuri's sister Hikari Mariya believes that Yuri has a crush on Godou, blowing things out of proportion. Due to their rivalry, Erica challenges Yuri to a baseball match, resulting in indescribable suffering for Godou as the catcher. After Yuri provides Godou with food, Erica convinces Yuri to be accompanied by Godou to buy her first cellphone, though Yuri has trouble operating one. That night, another Campione named Salvatore Doni calls Godou, telling him to fight Voban, who is currently in Japan, in order to become stronger. However, Godou hangs up in the middle of the call. Elsewhere, Yuri has her bath rudely interrupted by Liliana, who brings her to Voban in his mansion. Voban tells Yuri that he intends to reenact the sacrificial ceremony to summon a god that Salvatore had crashed four years ago to ease his boredom.
6	"The Kings Converse"; Transliteration: "Ōtachi Wa Hanashiau" (Japanese: 王たちは話し合う)	August 10, 2012
Amakasu asks Godou and Erica to rescue Yuri from Voban, since only a Campione can face against another Campione. As Godou and Erica make it past the obstacles in the mansion, Yuri voices her opinion to Liliana that Godou is not like the other Campiones. Once Godou and Erica meet Voban, Erica manipulates Voban into believing that Salvatore said that the elderly should accept their age and the youth should take over authority. In response, Voban releases Yuri from his mansion, for which he plans to hunt Godou down and take her back after giving them thirty minutes to run and hide. However, if they can last till sunrise, then he will admit defeat. After thirty minutes pass, a pack of wolves give chase, but Erica defeats them. Voban appears and summons an army of Dead Servants against her. Godou attacks Voban by calling forth the White Stallion, but Voban transforms into his werewolf form and consumes the White Stallion, prompting Godou to grab Yuri and retreat using the Raptor.
7	"Wind, Rain, Wolf"; Transliteration: "Kaze Yo, Ame Yo, Ōkami Yo" (Japanese: 風よ、雨よ、狼よ)	August 17, 2012
Erica enters into a fierce battle against Liliana. When Yuri tries to treat Godou for his wounds, Amakasu sends Yuri to persuade Liliana to stop fighting Erica and defect from Voban. Godou, Erica, Yuri and Liliana all prepare for the final showdown against Voban. Erica and Liliana deal with the Dead Servants surrounding them. After kissing Erica, Godou brings up Voban's past, annihilating the pack of wolves. However, in order to defeat Voban, Godou must successfully remake his golden sword, which will work after Yuri passionately kisses him. Even though Godou defeats Voban, the latter still has a trick up his sleeve, that is to completely control the weather. Godou uses the Goat to control thunder, and with the help of the three girls, he is able to defeat Voban once again. Although Voban survived the blast, sunrise occurs and Voban leaves while admitting defeat.
8	"A Hero Arrives"; Transliteration: "Eiyū Suizan" (Japanese: 英雄推参)	August 24, 2012
In Italy, Godou is stuck vacationing on a beach with Erica, Yuri, Lucrezia and Arianna, but it is not like he wanted this to happen in the first place. Trying to escape their antics, Godou runs into Athena, who wants him to come with her towards something that has stirred up her feelings of excitement. Meanwhile, Liliana realizes the error of seeking Salvatore's help in dealing with the Heraneion, a grimoire shaped like a stone pillar located in an underground chamber. When Salvatore slices the Heraneion in half, it transforms the land's energy into a dragon above. A rogue god named Perseus shows up to valiantly slay the dragon without any concern for the consequences, ignoring Liliana's pleas. Fortunately, Athena intervenes, while Liliana takes Godou away from the area, explaining to him what Salvatore did. When Perseus pursues the two, Godou calls forth the Boar to attack, but Perseus survives. Using the Raptor, Godou charges at Perseus. However, Perseus shoots Godou with an arrow to the chest.
9	"The Missing King" (Japanese: 行方不明の王様たち)	August 31, 2012
Athena stops Perseus from killing Godou, saying that Godou is much more interesting to fight after he has been beaten, which convinces Perseus to step back until next time. In another dream, Godou meets Pandora once again, where she notices that the Ram revived him, so she encourages him to defeat Perseus. When he recovers in Liliana's room, Liliana berates herself for her inaction earlier. Liliana's maid Karen Jankulovski tempts Liliana to prove her love interest in Godou, much to her embarrassment. Godou and Liliana then try to figure out how to counter Perseus's trump card. After Godou leaves to enjoy the view outside, Liliana later catches him reading her romance novel. Athena arrives to offer information about Perseus, but this means Godou will owe her a favor, to which Liliana rejects the offer. Liliana constantly struggles with her feelings with him when she tries to write love stories. She paralyzes him with tainted mint tea for her to personally confront Athena. However, Godou still has the strength to make the deal with Athena before she leaves. Meanwhile, Salvatore prevents the other girls from reaching Godou. Perseus soon after sends Godou and Liliana a message calling for a duel at a place he considers suitable for displaying his greatness to an audience.
10	"The Turbulent Demon King, The Sun Hero" (Japanese: 荒ぶる魔王、太陽の勇者)	September 7, 2012
Karen tells Liliana that the only way for Godou to defeat Perseus is through a kiss. However, Godou goes off on his own, disregarding such advice. When Liliana finds Godou near the coliseum, Perseus arrives and challenges him to a duel in front of the audience. Even when using the Bull to attack, Godou does not fare well against Perseus, much to Liliana's worry. Since Godou still does not have what he needs to achieve victory, Liliana makes a decision to kiss him, which gives him the necessary knowledge to defeat Perseus. During the battle, Godou reveals that Perseus disguised himself as a Greek god, for he is actually the Persian god Mithra. Although Godou breaks Perseus's bow and arrow, Perseus stabs Godou with his sword, but Godou uses the Camel to kick him away. Perseus then uses his ability to force Liliana into subservience to attack Godou, but Liliana manages to break free of the spell after hearing Godou call her name. Liliana shoots Perseus with her bow and arrows, allowing Godou to use the Boar to defeat Perseus. Athena appears to heal Godou's wounds by kissing him before departing, much to Liliana's chagrin. Perseus is killed by a shadowy figure with a scythe, who devours him in her serpent form. The other girls finally visit Godou in Liliana's room, where Karen had purposely told them about Godou's victory achieved by Liliana's kiss.
11	"Princess Maiden of the Long Sword" (Japanese: 太刀の媛巫女)	September 14, 2012
Liliana also transfers to Godou's school, again much to Shizuka's chagrin. When Godou and Liliana go to Yuri's shrine, they meet Yuri's friend Ena Seishuin, who claims to be chosen as Godou's wife. Her intentions attempt to question how Liliana and Yuri each feel about Godou. This later gives Erica to finally have the opportunity to go out on her first date with Godou. Liliana and Yuri soon realize how they feel about Godou, while Erica reminisces with Godou on their first victory together against Athena. The date is interrupted by Ena, who challenges Erica to a fight to the finish. However, Godou tries to cease the fight, but he is instead sucked into a portal underground to the Purgatory, prompting Erica and Ena to jump in as well. Meanwhile, Athena literally drops in on Shizuka at the Kusanagi household looking for Godou.
12	"The Sword of Ama no Murakumo" (Japanese: 天叢雲劍)	September 21, 2012
In the Purgatory, Godou meets Susanoo in a cabin, revealing himself as a god who is also Ena's guardian, and Godou begins to understand who Susanoo was before he retired to the Purgatory. Meanwhile, as they resume their intense fight in the mountains, Ena allows her sword to fully possess and control by her, which is gradually depleting Erica's energy. Liliana and Yuri witness a black aura filling the sky, covering the entire world. When Godou takes over the fight against Ena, she decides to retreat instead. As Erica is slowly dying, Godou tries to teleport her back on Earth, but ends up taking her to various places. At the Kusanagi household, Shizuka misunderstands the things Athena said about her relationship with Godou before suddenly leaving. On an island, as Erica says her last words, Godou finally masters summoning the Youth from Verethragna's spirit, having her ingest it through him to save her life and give her divine protection. While trying to rescue Godou and Erica, Liliana and Yuri are interrupted by the same scythe-wielding serpent goddess that consumed Perseus. At the shrine, when Ena reappears completely merged with her in the form of a god, Godou and Erica save her, but the serpent goddess, recognized as Metis, absorbs the power of Ena's sword.
13	"Tale of the God Slayer" (Japanese: 神殺しの物語)	September 28, 2012
Godou recalls from Susanoo that Metis, who is Athena's mother, wants to swallow the heavens as prophesied in the Gorgoneion, which actually does not pertain to Athena. Arianna and Amakasu come to retrieve Godou as well as Athena, who seems to have lost her memories after Metis previously absorbed her powers. Erica, Yuri, Liliana and Ena stay behind to try to buy enough time against Metis to allow Godou to recharge his powers. However, after the four are easily defeated, Metis comes after Godou, who manages to revive his powers. During the fight, Metis absorbs Athena's powers again, transforming her into her true goddess form. In order to prevent the prophecy from coming true, Godou receives help from each of the four girls to expose Metis's weaknesses. With the last kiss given by Athena after summoning her with the Gale, Godou is able to achieve victory, banishing the black aura from the sky and returning everything back to normal.
