= Ron Kamonohashi =

Japanese manga series by Akira Amano

- Ron Kamonohashi: Deranged Detective
- First tankōbon volume cover, featuring Ron Kamonohashi

鴨乃橋ロンの禁断推理 (Kamonohashi Ron no Kindan Suiri)
- Genre: Crime; Mystery
- Manga
- Written by: Akira Amano
- Published by: Shueisha
- Imprint: Jump Comics+
- Magazine: Shōnen Jump+
- Original run: October 11, 2020 – July 6, 2025
- Volumes: 19
- Anime television series

Ron Kamonohashi's Forbidden Deductions
- Directed by: Shōta Ihata
- Written by: Wataru Watari
- Music by: Yo Tsuji
- Studio: Diomedéa
- Licensed by: Crunchyroll (streaming); SA / SEA: Medialink
- Original network: Tokyo MX, AT-X, KBS Kyoto, SUN, BS11, TV Aichi, TVh, TVQ, SBS Shizuoka
- Original run: October 2, 2023 – December 30, 2024
- Episodes: 26
- icon

Ron Kamonohashi: Deranged Detective (Japanese: 鴨乃橋ロンの禁断推理, Hepburn: Kamonohashi Ron no Kindan Suiri; lit. 'Ron Kamonohashi's Forbidden Deductions') is a Japanese web manga series written and illustrated by Akira Amano. It was serialized in Shueisha's Shōnen Jump+ from October 2020 to July 2025, with its chapters collected into 19 tankōbon volumes as of October 2025. Shueisha also simultaneously publishes the series in English on the Manga Plus online platform.

An anime television series adaptation produced by Diomedéa aired from October to December 2023. A second season premiered in October 2024.

== Premise ==
The series focuses on the adventures of Ron Kamonohashi, an eccentric private detective, and Totomaru Isshiki, an unskilled police officer, as they solve crimes together. Five years ago, Ron was the top student at the Detective Training Academy Blue. However, after being found responsible via temporary insanity for a deadly incident known as the "Bloody Field Trip", his detective license was revoked and he was expelled. Unable to fulfill his only love of solving mysteries, Ron has lived in isolation since. When Totomaru seeks his help on a case, the two form a partnership where Totomaru takes the credit for the cases that Ron solves.

== Characters ==
=== Main characters ===
Ron Kamonohashi (鴨乃橋 ロン, Kamonohashi Ron)
Voiced by: Yōhei Azakami
Portrayed by: Yuta Kishimoto
A sixth-generation descendant of Sherlock Holmes, and a ninth-generation descendant of James Moriarty. His detective license was revoked five years ago following the "Bloody Field Trip", an incident he cannot remember. Whenever he hears a murderer confess their crime, Ron enters an uncontrollable state where he pressures and convinces them to kill themselves.
Totomaru Isshiki (一色 都々丸, Isshiki Totomaru)
Voiced by: Junya Enoki
Portrayed by: Yutaka Nozaki
A police detective in the Metropolitan Police Department who gains some renown by taking credit for the cases that Ron solves. Ron calls him by the nickname "Toto" (トト).
Amamiya (雨宮)
Voiced by: Yoko Hikasa
Portrayed by: Haruna Ishii
Totomaru's boss in the Metropolitan Police. Although usually cold and serious, she has a crush on Ron, whom she thinks is named "Kamoo" (鴨夫).
Mofu Usaki (卯咲 もふ, Usaki Mofu)
Voiced by: Nao Tōyama
Portrayed by: Marina Tanoue
A renowned neurosurgeon who is extremely clumsy outside the operating room and is always wearing bandages due to her injuries. She concocts a combination of medicines to suppress Ron's "culprit-killing" syndrome, but there are side effects.
Omito Kawasemi (翡翠 臣疾, Kawasemi Omito)
Voiced by: Jun Fukuyama
Portrayed by: Hiroki Suzuki
A pedantic detective from the Aichi Prefectural Police. He has the highest number of solved cases in the entire country and is an old colleague of Amamiya.
Chikori Monki (門季 チコリ, Monki Chikori)
Voiced by: Konomi Kohara
A crime reporter who often helps Totomaru and Ron with research and information gathering. She greatly admires Totomaru and dislikes Ron.
Elmer Stingray (エルマー・スティングレイ, Erumā Sutingurei)
An American who transferred to Blue Academy three days before the "Bloody Field Trip" and claims to have been Ron's friend, although Ron does not remember him. He is revealed to be an assistant to the Holmes family, specifically to Ron's mother, who views him as an adopted son.

=== Blue ===
The Detective Training Academy Blue (探偵養成学校BLUE) in England is the world's most prestigious academy for training detectives.

Spitz Feier (シュピッツ・ファイア, Shupittsu Faia)
Voiced by: Taku Yashiro
Portrayed by: Ryōma Baba
The tracking instructor at Blue, who is sent to investigate whether Ron is violating his detective ban. However, his actual goal is to have Ron help him find his missing brother. Spitz befriends Ron and Totomaru and continues to assist them on various cases.
Fin Fennec (フィン・フェネック, Fin Fenekku)
Voiced by: Megumi Han
The locked room instructor at Blue and one of less than 10 people in the world who have an S-rank detective license.
Shachi (シャチ)
Fin's bodyguard and a graduate of Blue. He attended the academy at the same time as Ron. He is revealed to be the M. Family's informant at Blue.
Hirsch (ヒルシュ, Hirushu)
Voiced by: Kenjiro Tsuda
The anatomy instructor at Blue. He has been a suspect in 15 murder cases, with one of these instances being the reason he was demoted to A-rank detective.
Emme Emmerich (エメ・エメリッヒ, Eme Emerihhi) (Note: Principal Emmerich's given name has been variously spelled in English as "Eme", "Emme", or "Aimee".)
Voiced by: Kikuko Inoue
The principal of Blue and a friend of Ron's parents. She informs Ron of the M. Family's involvement in the Bloody Field Trip incident, though discretely due to there being an M. Family informant at Blue.
John Grizzly (ジョン・グリズリー, Jon Gurizurī)
Voiced by: Kazuhiro Yamaji
Portrayed by: Shūhei Izumi
The closed circle instructor at Blue.
Night Bran Jr. (ナイト・ブラン・Jr., Naito Buran Jr.)
The number one student at Blue, son of a vice-chairmen of the World Detective Alliance, and a descendant of the first principal of Blue.
Alyssa Beaumont (アリッサ・ボーモント, Arissa Bōmonto)
The number two student at Blue, who wears a headband with rabbit ears on it.
Hutter Horn (ハッター・ホルン, Hattā Horun)
A top student at Blue, who attends thanks to a scholarship under John Grizzly.
Marsh Leipley (マーシュ・レプレー, Māshu Repurē)
A top student at Blue.

=== M. Family ===
The Moriarty Family (モリアーティ家), more commonly referred to as the "M. Family" (M家), is a legendary crime syndicate and the archenemy of the Holmes detective family.

Tiger Dan (タイガ・ダン, Taiga Dan)
Voiced by: Takehito Koyasu
Milo's uncle, whose real name is Daniel Moriarty (ダニエル・モリアーティ, Danieru Moriāti).
Winter Moriarty (ウィンター・モリアーティ, Uintā Moriāti)
Voiced by: Yumiri Hanamori
Portrayed by: Mizuho Habu
The fourth child of the M. Family who specializes in disguises. After failing at a mission, Milo has an assassin shoot Winter, but then has doctors nurse her back to health as she survives the attack. After recovering, Winter splits from Milo, whom she never forgave for killing their younger sister Alice.
Milo Moriarty (マイロ・モリアーティ, Mairo Moriāti)
Voiced by: Yoshitsugu Matsuoka
Portrayed by: Yoshihide Sasaki
The eldest child and head of the M. Family. He killed his younger sister Alice in order to earn that position. After he loses to Ron, Milo is attacked on the orders of the "new boss" of the family. This is later revealed to be Alice, who survived because she tampered with the gun before Milo shot her. "Disappointed" that Milo showed emotion by hugging her and crying after the shooting, Alice plotted to steal the M. Family away from him once she turned 17.
Alice Moriarty (アリス・モリアーティ, Arisu Moriāti)
The youngest child of the M. Family. Initially believed to be dead, Alice first appears in the series under the guise of "Billy Za Gojila" (ビリー・ザ・ゴジラ, Birī Za Gojira), nicknamed "Billy Goji", a top student at Blue who always has various animals on her. She perpetrates a series of murders at Blue, before escaping custody as her true identity is revealed.

=== World Detective Alliance ===
Kei Moore Kikuma (菊間・ケイ・ムーア, Kikuma Kei Mūa)
Director of the Japanese Branch of the World Detective Alliance, an underclassman of Ron at Blue, and the son of Kiku, a police officer and friend of Ron.

== Media ==
=== Manga ===
Ron Kamonohashi: Deranged Detective, written and illustrated by Akira Amano, began its bi-weekly serialization in Shueisha's online magazine Shōnen Jump+ on October 11, 2020. The series ended its first part on April 30, 2023, with the second part beginning on June 4. The second part concluded on July 6, 2025. Shueisha has collected its chapters into individual tankōbon volumes. The first volume was released on February 4, 2021. As of October 3, 2025, nineteen volumes have been released.

The series has been licensed for simultaneous publication in North America as it is released in Japan, with its chapters being digitally launched in English by Shueisha on its Manga Plus service.

==== Volumes ====
No.	Release date	ISBN
1	February 4, 2021	978-4-08-882564-9
1. "The Case of the Metropolitan Serial Drownings" (大都会連続溺死事件, Dai Tokai Renzoku Dekishi Jiken); 2. "The Case of the Locked Room Piggy Bank Theft" (密室の貯金箱盗難事件, Misshitsu no Chokin-bako Tōnan Jiken); 3–4. "The Case of the Benizome Hot Springs Murder Pts. 1–2" (紅染温泉殺人事件①–②, Benizome Onsen Satsujin Jiken ①–②); 5. "The Case of the Hand Collector Killer Pt. 1" (ハンドコレクター殺人事件①, Hando Korekutā Satsujin Jiken ①)
2	April 30, 2021	978-4-08-882650-9
6. "The Case of the Hand Collector Killer Pt. 2" (ハンドコレクター殺人事件②, Hando Korekutā Satsujin Jiken ②); 7–8. "The Case of the Live Broadcast Murder Pts. 1–2" (生放送殺人事件①–②, Namahōsō Satsujin Jiken ①–②); 9–12. "The Case of the Island Observatory Murder Pts. 1–4" (孤島天文台殺人事件①–④, Kotō Tenmondai Satsujin Jiken ①–④)
3	August 4, 2021	978-4-08-882738-4
13. "The Case of the Island Observatory Murder Pt. 5" (孤島天文台殺人事件⑤, Kotō Tenmondai Satsujin Jiken ⑤); 14–15. "The Case of the Poisoned Latté Pts. 1–2" (毒入りカフェラテ殺人事件①–②, Doku-iri Kafe Rate Satsujin Jiken ①–②); Special ch. "The Case of the Sandbox Murder at Dawn" (夜明けの砂場殺人事件, Yoake no Sunaba Satsujin Jiken) (Note: Originally published as a one-shot in Weekly Shōnen Jump Issue 10 of 2021. First published simply under the series' title, the chapter received a proper title with its tankōbon release.); 16–17. "The Case of the Mad Chameleon Murder Pts. 1–2" (マッドカメレオン殺人事件①–②, Maddo Kamereon Satsujin Jiken ①–②); 18. "The Case of the Yadagami-sama Murders Pt. 1" (夜蛇神様殺人事件①, Yadagami-sama Satsujin Jiken ①)
4	November 4, 2021	978-4-08-882840-4
19–21. "The Case of the Yadagami-sama Murders Pts. 2–4" (夜蛇神様殺人事件②–④, Yadagami-sama Satsujin Jiken ②–④); 22–27. "The Case of the Shibuya Revelation Serial Murders Pts. 1–6 (渋谷黙示録連続殺人事件①–⑥, Shibuya Mokushiroku Renzoku Satsujin Jiken ①–⑥); 28. "The Case of the Midsummer Beach Hut Drowning Pt. 1" (真夏の海の家水死事件①, Manatsu no Uminoya Suishi Jiken ①)
5	February 4, 2022	978-4-08-883021-6
29–30. "The Case of the Midsummer Beach Hut Drowning Pts. 2–3" (真夏の海の家水死事件②–③, Manatsu no Uminoya Suishi Jiken ②–③); 31–34. "The Case of the Genius Composer Kidnapping Pts. 1–4" (天才作曲家誘拐事件①–④, Tensai Sakkyokka Yūkai Jiken ①–④); 35–37. "The Case of the Psychological Research Lab Murder Pts. 1–3" (心理学研究室殺人事件①–③, Shinri-gaku Kenkyūshitsu Satsujin Jiken ①–③); 38. "The Case of the Plateau Auberge Serial Murders Pt. 1" (高原オーベルジュ連続殺人事件①, Kōgen Ōberuju Renzoku Satsujin Jiken ①)
6	May 2, 2022	978-4-08-883108-4
39–45. "The Case of the Plateau Auberge Serial Murders Pts. 2–8" (高原オーベルジュ連続殺人事件②–⑧, Kōgen Ōberuju Renzoku Satsujin Jiken ②–⑧); 46–48. "The Case of the Fortuneteller Prince Murder Pts. 1–3" (占いプリンス殺人事件①–③, Uranai Purinsu Satsujin Jiken ①–③)
7	August 4, 2022	978-4-08-883207-4
49–50. "The Case of the Severed Head Balloon Pts. 1–2" (風船生首殺人事件①–②, Fūsen Namakubi Satsujin Jiken ①–②); 51–57. "The Case of the Twin Prison Locked Room Murder Pts. 1–7" (「双子の牢」密室殺人事件①–⑦, 「Futago no Rō」 Misshitsu Satsujin Jiken ①–⑦); 58. "The Case of the Missing Cabbage Pt. 1" (消えた白菜事件①, Kieta Hakusai Jiken ①)
8	November 4, 2022	978-4-08-883298-2
59. "The Case of the Missing Cabbage Pt. 2" (消えた白菜事件②, Kieta Hakusai Jiken ②); 60–62. "The Case of the Invisible Blood Letter Murder Pts. 1–3 (見えない血文字殺人事件①–③, Mienai Chi Moji Satsujin Jiken ①–③); 63–67. "The Case of the Coin and Carving Murders Pts. 1–5 (硬貨と刻印殺人事件①–⑤, Kōka to Kokuin Satsujin Jiken ①–⑤); 68. "The Case of the Obon Dance Murder Pt. 1" (盆踊り殺人事件①, Bon'odori Satsujin Jiken ①)
9	January 4, 2023	978-4-08-883351-4
69–71. "The Case of the Obon Dance Murder Pts. 2–4" (盆踊り殺人事件②–④, Bon'odori Satsujin Jiken ②–④); 72–73. "An Invitation From Milo Pts. 1–2" (マイロからの招待状①–②, Mairo Kara no Jōtaijō ①–②); 74–75. "The Case of the Bloody Field Trip Pts. 1–2" (血の実習事件①–②, Chi no Jisshū Jiken ①–②); 76–78. "The Case of the Tragic Cruise Serial Murders Pts. 1–3" (悲劇の航海連続殺人事件①–③, Higeki no Kōkai Renzoku Satsujin Jiken ①–③)
10	April 4, 2023	978-4-08-883473-3
79–88. "The Case of the Tragic Cruise Serial Murders Pts. 4–13" (悲劇の航海連続殺人事件④–⑬, Higeki no Kōkai Renzoku Satsujin Jiken ④–⑬)
11	July 4, 2023	978-4-08-883615-7
89–96. "The Case of the Tragic Cruise Serial Murders Pts. 14–21" (悲劇の航海連続殺人事件⑭–㉑, Higeki no Kōkai Renzoku Satsujin Jiken ⑭–㉑); 97. "Ron Kamonohashi's Homecoming Pt. 1" (鴨乃橋ロンの帰還①, Kamonohashi Ron no Kikan ①)
12	October 4, 2023	978-4-08-883732-1
98–100. "Ron Kamonohashi's Homecoming Pts. 2–4" (鴨乃橋ロンの帰還②–④, Kamonohashi Ron no Kikan ②–④); 101–106. "The Case of the Cryptid Serial Murders Pts. 1–6" (幻想獣連続殺人事件①–⑥, Gensō-Jū Renzoku Satsujin Jiken ①–⑥)
13	March 4, 2024	978-4-08-883861-8
107–115. "The Case of the Cryptid Serial Murders Pts. 7–15" (幻想獣連続殺人事件⑦–⑮, Gensō-Jū Renzoku Satsujin Jiken ⑦–⑮)
14	June 4, 2024	978-4-08-884083-3
116. "The Case of the Cryptid Serial Murders Pt. 16" (幻想獣連続殺人事件⑯, Gensō-Jū Renzoku Satsujin Jiken ⑯); 117–120. "The Mystery of Maison de Kamonohashi Pts. 1–4" (メゾン・ド・カモノハシの怪事件①–④, Mezon do Kamonohashi no Kai Jiken ①–④); 121–124. "The Case of the Kamakura Teahouse Murder Pts. 1–4" (鎌倉茶屋殺人事件①–④, Kamakura Chaya Satsujin Jiken ①–④); 125. "Target: World Detective Alliance Pt. 1" (狙われる世界探偵連盟①, Nerawa Reru Sekai Tantei Renmei ①)
15	October 4, 2024	978-4-08-884231-8
126. "Target: World Detective Alliance Pt. 2" (狙われる世界探偵連盟②, Nerawa Reru Sekai Tantei Renmei ②); 127–132. "The Case of the Ferris Wheel Disappearance Pts. 1–6" (大観覧車密室消失事件①–⑥, Dai Kanran-sha Misshitsu Shōshitsu Jiken ①–⑥); 133–135. "Ron Kamonohashi Under Siege Pts. 1–3" (包囲される鴨乃橋ロン①–③, Hōi Sareru Kamonohashi Ron ①–③) (Note: Originally titled "The Case of the Ferris Wheel Disappearance Pts. 7–9" on Shōnen Jump+, these chapters' titles were changed for the tankōbon release.)
16	February 4, 2025	978-4-08-884440-4
136–145. "The Case of the Tokyo Chimera Serial Murders Pts. 1–10" (東京キメラ連続殺人事件①–⑩, Tōkyō Kimera Renzoku Satsujin Jiken ①–⑩)
17	June 4, 2025	978-4-08-884553-1
146–147. "The Case of the Tokyo Chimera Serial Murders Pts. 11–12" (東京キメラ連続殺人事件⑪–⑫, Tōkyō Kimera Renzoku Satsujin Jiken ⑪–⑫); 148–151. "Night Before the Final Showdown with Alice Pts. 1–4" (アリスとの決戦前夜①–④, Arisu to no Kessen Zen'ya ①–④); 152–154. "The Case of the Time Island Serial Murders Pts. 1–3" (刻の島連続殺人事件①–③, Koku no Shima Renzoku Satsujin Jiken ①–③)
18	September 4, 2025	978-4-08-884672-9
155–163. "The Case of the Time Island Serial Murders Pts. 4–12" (刻の島連続殺人事件④–⑫, Koku no Shima Renzoku Satsujin Jiken ④–⑫) (Note: Chapters 155–158 were originally translated as "The Case of the Koku Island Serial Murders Pts. 4–7". Their titles were retroactively changed with the release of chapter 159.)
19	October 3, 2025	978-4-08-884725-2
164–169. "The Case of the Time Island Serial Murders Pts. 13–18" (刻の島連続殺人事件⑬–⑱, Koku no Shima Renzoku Satsujin Jiken ⑬–⑱); 170. "A New Forbidden Deduction" (新たな禁断推理, Aratana Kindan Suiri)

=== Anime ===
An anime television series adaptation was announced on December 18, 2022. The series is produced by Diomedéa and directed by Shōta Ihata, with scripts written by Wataru Watari, character designs handled by Masakazu Ishikawa, and music composed by Yo Tsuji. The series aired from October 2 to December 25, 2023, on Tokyo MX, AT-X, and other networks. The opening theme song is "Ikenai Fool Logic" (いけない fool logic) by Unison Square Garden, while the ending theme song is "Lipsync" (リップシンク) by Hockrockb.

Following the airing of the final episode, a second season was announced. It aired from October 7 to December 30, 2024. The opening theme song is "Feedback o Narashite" (フィードバックを鳴らして; "Playing Feedback"), by Humbreaders, while the ending theme song is "Labyrinth" (ラビリンス, Rabirinsu), by Hockrockb.

Crunchyroll streamed the series outside of Asia under the title Ron Kamonohashi's Forbidden Deductions. Medialink licensed the series in South, Southeast Asia, and Oceania (except Australia and New Zealand) and is streaming it on its Ani-One Asia YouTube channel for its Ultra subscribers.

==== Episodes ====
===== Season 1 (2023) =====
No. overall	No. in season	Title	Directed by (Note: Production staff information is taken from the ending credits of each episode.)	Written by	Storyboarded by	Original release date
1	1	"The Case of the Metropolitan Serial Drownings"; Transliteration: "Daitokai Renzoku Dekishi Jiken" (Japanese: 大都会連続溺死事件)	Shōta Ihata	Shōta Ihata	Shōta Ihata	October 2, 2023
2	2	"The Case of the Locked-Room Piggy Bank Theft"; Transliteration: "Misshitsu no Chokinbako Tōnan Jiken" (Japanese: 密室の貯金箱盗難事件)	Shingo Tamaki	Wataru Watari	Shingo Tamaki	October 9, 2023
3	3	"The Case of the Benizome Hot Spring Murder (Part 1)"; Transliteration: "Benizome Onsen Satsujin Jiken【Zenpen】" (Japanese: 紅染温泉殺人事件【前編】)	Ageha Kochōran	Sō Sagara	Shōta Ihata	October 16, 2023
4	4	"The Case of the Benizome Hot Spring Murder (Part 2)"; Transliteration: "Benizome Onsen Satsujin Jiken【Kōhen】" (Japanese: 紅染温泉殺人事件【後編】)	Ageha Kochōran	Sō Sagara	Shōta Ihata	October 23, 2023
5	5	"The Case of the Hand Collector"; Transliteration: "Hando Korekutā Satsujin Jiken" (Japanese: ハンドコレクター殺人事件)	Shingo Tamaki	Jackson Ou	Shingo Tamaki	October 30, 2023
6	6	"The Case of the Live Broadcast Murder"; Transliteration: "Namahōsō Satsujin Jiken" (Japanese: 生放送殺人事件)	Ageha Kochōran	Sō Sagara	Sorato Shimizu	November 6, 2023
7	7	"The Case of the Observatory Murder (Part 1)"; Transliteration: "Kotō Tenmondai Satsujin Jiken【Zenpen】" (Japanese: 孤島天文台殺人事件【前編】)	Keizō Kusakawa	Wataru Watari	Keizō Kusakawa	November 13, 2023
8	8	"The Case of the Observatory Murder (Part 2)"; Transliteration: "Kotō Tenmondai Satsujin Jiken【Chūhen】" (Japanese: 孤島天文台殺人事件【中編】)	Keizō Kusakawa	Wataru Watari	Keizō Kusakawa	November 20, 2023
9	9	"The Case of the Observatory Murder (Part 3)"; Transliteration: "Kotō Tenmondai Satsujin Jiken【Kōhen】" (Japanese: 孤島天文台殺人事件【後編】)	Keizō Kusakawa, Shingo Tamaki & Ageha Kochōran	Wataru Watari	Keizō Kusakawa	November 27, 2023
10	10	"The Case of the Poisoned Latte"; Transliteration: "Doku-Iri Kafe Rate Satsujin Jiken" (Japanese: 毒入りカフェラテ殺人事件)	Shōta Ihata, Keizō Kusakawa & Ageha Kochōran	Sō Sagara	Shōta Ihata	December 4, 2023
11	11	"The Case of the Mad Chameleon Murder"; Transliteration: "Maddo Kamereon Satsujin Jiken" (Japanese: マッドカメレオン殺人事件)	Shingo Tamaki	Jackson Ou	Shingo Tamaki	December 11, 2023
12	12	"The Case of the Yadagami-sama Murders (Part 1)"; Transliteration: "Yadagami-sama Satsujin Jiken【Zenpen】" (Japanese: 夜蛇神様殺人事件【前編】)	Shōta Ihata & Shingo Tamaki	Wataru Watari	Sorato Shimizu	December 18, 2023
13	13	"The Case of the Yadagami-sama Murders (Part 2)"; Transliteration: "Yadagami-sama Satsujin Jiken【Kōhen】" (Japanese: 夜蛇神様殺人事件【後編】)	Shōta Ihata	Wataru Watari	Shōta Ihata	December 25, 2023

===== Season 2 (2024) =====
No. overall	No. in season	Title	Directed by	Written by	Storyboarded by	Original release date
14	1	"The Case of the Shibuya Apocalypse Serial Murders (Part 1)"; Transliteration: "Shibuya Mokushiroku Renzoku Satsujin Jiken【Zenpen】" (Japanese: 渋谷黙示録連続殺人事件【前編】)	Shōta Ihata	Shōta Ihata	Shōta Ihata	October 7, 2024
15	2	"The Case of the Shibuya Apocalypse Serial Murders (Part 2)"; Transliteration: "Shibuya Mokushiroku Renzoku Satsujin Jiken【Chūhen】" (Japanese: 渋谷黙示録連続殺人事件【中編】)	Shōta Ihata	Shōta Ihata	Shōta Ihata	October 14, 2024
16	3	"The Case of the Shibuya Apocalypse Serial Murders (Part 3)"; Transliteration: "Shibuya Mokushiroku Renzoku Satsujin Jiken [Kōhen]" (Japanese: 渋谷黙示録連続殺人事件【後編】)	Shōta Ihata	Shōta Ihata	Shōta Ihata	October 21, 2024
17	4	"The Case of the Midsummer Beachside Stand Drowning (Part 1)"; Transliteration: "Manatsu no Umi no Ie Suishi Jiken【Zenpen】" (Japanese: 真夏の海の家水死事件【前編】)	Keizō Kusakawa	Sō Sagara	Keizō Kusakawa	October 28, 2024
18	5	"The Case of the Midsummer Beachside Stand Drowning (Part 2)"; Transliteration: "Manatsu no Umi no Ie Suishi Jiken【Kōhen】" (Japanese: 真夏の海の家水死事件【後編】)	Keizō Kusakawa	Sō Sagara	Keizō Kusakawa	November 4, 2024
19	6	"The Case of the Genius Composer Abduction (Part 1)"; Transliteration: "Tensai Sakkyokuka Yūkai Jiken【Zenpen】" (Japanese: 天才作曲家誘拐事件【前編】)	Shingo Tamaki	Jackson Ou	Shingo Tamaki	November 11, 2024
20	7	"The Case of the Genius Composer Abduction (Part 2)"; Transliteration: "Tensai Sakkyokuka Yūkai Jiken【Kōhen】" (Japanese: 天才作曲家誘拐事件【後編】)	Shingo Tamaki	Jackson Ou	Shingo Tamaki	November 18, 2024
21	8	"The Case of the Psychology Research Lab Murder (Part 1)"; Transliteration: "Shinrigaku Kenkyū Shitsu Satsujin Jiken【Zenpen】" (Japanese: 心理学研究室殺人事件【前編】)	Keizō Kusakawa	Sō Sagara	Keizō Kusakawa	November 25, 2024
22	9	"The Case of the Psychology Research Lab Murder (Part 2)"; Transliteration: "Shinrigaku Kenkyū Shitsu Satsujin Jiken【Kōhen】" (Japanese: 心理学研究室殺人事件【後編】)	Keizō Kusakawa	Sō Sagara	Keizō Kusakawa & Shōta Ihata	December 2, 2024
23	10	"The Case of the Highland Auberge Serial Murders (Part 1)"; Transliteration: "Kōgen Ōberuju Renzoku Satsujin Jiken【Zenpen】" (Japanese: 高原オーベルジュ連続殺人事件【前編】)	Shōta Ihata	Wataru Watari	Shōta Ihata	December 9, 2024
24	11	"The Case of the Highland Auberge Serial Murders (Part 2)"; Transliteration: "Kōgen Ōberuju Renzoku Satsujin Jiken【Chūhen】" (Japanese: 高原オーベルジュ連続殺人事件【中編】)	Shingo Tamaki	Wataru Watari	Shingo Tamaki	December 16, 2024
25	12	"The Case of the Highland Auberge Serial Murders (Part 3)"; Transliteration: "Kōgen Ōberuju Renzoku Satsujin Jiken【Kōhen】" (Japanese: 高原オーベルジュ連続殺人事件【後編】)	Shingo Tamaki	Wataru Watari	Shingo Tamaki	December 23, 2024
26	13	"The Case of the Highland Auberge Serial Murders (Part 4)"; Transliteration: "Kōgen Ōberuju Renzoku Satsujin Jiken【Kanketsuhen】" (Japanese: 高原オーベルジュ連続殺人事件【完結編】)	Shōta Ihata & Shingo Tamaki	Wataru Watari	Shōta Ihata	December 30, 2024

=== Stage play ===
A stage play adaptation ran from November 1–4, 2024, at the Nippon Seinenkan Hall in Tokyo, and on November 9 and 10 at the Sankei Hall Breeze in Osaka. It was written and directed by Keita Kawajiri, with music composed by Futoshi Arai.

== Reception ==
In June 2021, Ron Kamonohashi: Deranged Detective was nominated for the seventh Next Manga Awards in the Best Web Manga category and placed 14th out of 50 nominees. The series has been recommended by mystery writers Rintaro Norizuki, Masaki Tsuji and Sako Aizawa, all of whom have topped the Kono Mystery ga Sugoi! list. In a blurb, Aizawa called the series an "authentic mystery manga for the new era" and praised its fast pace, as well as the tricks and logic used to identify the culprits. Ryoko Fukuda of Real Sound compared the relationship between Ron and Toto to that of the straight man and funny man roles in manzai comedy, and said she was looking forward to how the "pop, fast-paced story" would develop.
