= Riddle Story of Devil =

Japanese manga series & anime

- Cover of Riddle Story of Devil volume 1, featuring Tokaku Azuma.

悪魔のリドル (Akuma no Ridoru)
- Genre: Action, yuri
- Manga
- Written by: Yun Kōga
- Illustrated by: Sunao Minakata
- Published by: Kadokawa Shoten
- English publisher: NA: Seven Seas Entertainment
- Magazine: Newtype
- Original run: September 2012 – November 2016
- Volumes: 5
- Anime television series
- Directed by: Keizō Kusakawa
- Produced by: Toshihiro Maeda; Gorō Shinjuku; Jun Fukuda; Takashi Kikuya; Mika Shimizu; Hiroyuki Tajima; Atsushi Aitani; Tomohito Nagase; Teppei Nojima
- Written by: Kiyoko Yoshimura
- Music by: Yoshiaki Fujisawa
- Studio: Diomedéa
- Licensed by: Crunchyroll (Note: Home video and streaming rights available in North America through Crunchyroll (previously Funimation) and Australia via Crunchyroll Store Australia (formerly Madman Anime)): UK: Anime Limited (cancelled); SA/SEA: Muse Communication
- Original network: MBS, TBS, CBC, AT-X, BS-TBS
- English network: SEA: Animax Asia
- Original run: April 3, 2014 – June 19, 2014
- Episodes: 12 + OVA

Riddle Story of Devil (Japanese: 悪魔のリドル, Hepburn: Akuma no Ridoru; lit. Devil's Riddle) is a Japanese manga series written by Yun Kōga and illustrated by Sunao Minakata. It was serialized in Kadokawa Shoten's Newtype magazine between the September 2012 and November 2016 issues and is licensed in English by Seven Seas Entertainment. This series, set in Kagawa Prefecture, tells a story of a young undercover assassin named Tokaku Azuma who chooses to protect her target-turned-friend Haru Ichinose from 11 other assassins who each want to claim the student's life and an extraordinary reward.

An anime adaptation directed by Keizō Kusakawa and animated by Diomedéa aired in Japan between April and June 2014. The series is licensed for streaming and home video in North America and Australia by Crunchyroll and Muse Communication in Southeast Asia and South Asia. The original title is a pun on Devil's Trill (悪魔のトリル, Akuma no Toriru) by Giuseppe Tartini.

== Plot ==
At a private girls' boarding school, Myōjō Academy, thirteen girls are transferred into the academy's "10th Year Class Black" (10年黒組, Jūnen Kurogumi). Of these thirteen students, twelve are assassins from various backgrounds who are all tasked with assassinating the remaining student, a girl named Haru Ichinose. If they succeed, they will be granted any wish they desire, but if they fail, they are expelled from the class. However, one of the assassins, Tokaku Azuma, has sworn to protect Haru from the other assassins.

== Characters ==
Tokaku Azuma (東 兎角, Azuma Tokaku)
Voiced by: Ayaka Suwa (Japanese); Morgan Berry (English)
No. 1 of Class Black, the protagonist of the story. Tokaku is a distant and cold girl who comes from the infamous Azuma family, a feared family of skilled assassins, and has a blue bob and blue eyes, which are narrower than the other girls'. Despite this however, following a traumatic event in her past, she has never killed anyone before, getting nicknamed a "virgin" by Isuke. She later overcomes this. It is hinted she develops romantic feelings for Haru. After seemingly killing Haru, she wishes to be with her, which is granted after Haru survives her attempt.
Haru Ichinose (一ノ瀬 晴, Ichinose Haru)
Voiced by: Hisako Kanemoto (Japanese); Alexis Tipton (English)
No. 13 of Class Black, the second main character. Haru is a bright and cheerful girl, with light red hair in pigtails and amber eyes, who aims to become friends with everyone. She firmly believes in smiling no matter the situation and has proven she isn't completely helpless, since she defeats both Otoya and Sumireko's attempts on her life. She is part of the same clan as Meichi Yuri and has a Queen Bee effect on her as part of it. If she survives Class Black, she is free of the clan's burden on her.
Isuke Inukai (犬飼 伊介, Inukai Isuke)
Voiced by: Azumi Asakura (Japanese); Jamie Marchi (English)
No. 2 of Class Black, a selfish and haughty girl. She is very blunt and quick to express her opinion, and likes to command other people. Isuke's family includes her adoptive gay parents, one being called Eisuke, which is where her name originates. Isuke is the ninth to be expelled after she is dispatched by Tokaku after she overcomes her demons. In the finale, she is shown to be on vacation with her parents, disappointed about her outcome. A recurring gag is that Isuke always sleeps in class, and is always unaware of the fact, which leads to her confusion to her low test scores.
Koko Kaminaga (神長 香子, Kaminaga Kōko)
Voiced by: Haruka Yoshimura (Japanese); Clarine Harp (English)
No. 3 of Class Black, the class representative; a quiet, bookish, and somewhat distant girl. She is shown to use both improvised and purposed-made explosives as a weapon. Koko is very strategic with her plans, though she is still defeated by Tokaku and Haru. She is the second to be expelled. In the past, she was responsible for her mentor's death after her explosives went off too early, leading to her calculated approach to assassination. In the finale, she is still on the run from her clan, and her wish was to leave the assassination business.
Hitsugi Kirigaya (桐ヶ谷 柩, Kirigaya Hitsugi)
Voiced by: Mami Uchida (Japanese); Natalie Hoover (English)
No. 4 of Class Black, a girl who resembles an elementary-school student. She has flowing cyan hair and always carries around a pink teddy bear. She is almost always with Chitaru, who helped her when she got lost. Despite her young psychique, she is quite clever and is revealed to be the assassin called Angel's Trumpet, who was the one responsible for killing the daughter of Chitaru's mentor. She carries a poison gun in her teddy bear, which she uses on Shiena. During the play Romeo and Juliet, Chitaru stabs her, only for Nio to tell her that her wish was to forever be with her. In the finale, she is fully healed and supports Chitaru's recovery in hospital. She is the fifth to be expelled.
Shiena Kenmochi (剣持 しえな, Kenmochi Shiena)
Voiced by: Yūki Yamada (Japanese); Anastasia Muñoz (English)
No. 5 of Class Black, a cheerful girl and slightly scatterbrained girl who wears glasses and has a beige and brown color scheme. She is in charge of the play Romeo and Juliet. She is the only student who doesn't get their own episode arc, as she is poisoned by Hitsugi early on and is expelled due to health reasons. She is also the only student who doesn't have their own outro song. In the finale, she is seen hacking into Myojo Academy to reveal Class Black's secrets. She is part of a group of bullied children. Her wish was unknown. She is the fourth to be expelled.
Haruki Sagae (寒河江 春紀, Sagae Haruki)
Voiced by: Fumiko Uchimura (Japanese); Carli Mosier (English)
No. 6 of Class Black, a tomboyish yet fashionable girl who is always shown eating pocky. Haruki is rather carefree, calm and relaxed—to the point where she even views her own death in a calm fashion—but is sensitive about her adoptive family, in which she has many siblings, and wants to keep them protected and safe at all costs. Haruki is shown to go to extremes in order to achieve her goals—when she learnt from Nio that her own death would still ensure her wish was granted even if she failed to kill Haru, Haruki set up a trap with the intention of taking her own life. Though she survived, Haruki was only merely disappointed about her failure. Haruki is the third student of Class Black to be expelled. Following her expulsion, she works as a construction worker and studies to get into college.
Suzu Shutō (首藤 涼, Shutō Suzu)
Voiced by: Chika Anzai (Japanese); Michelle Rojas (English)
No. 7 of Class Black, a somewhat sly girl who likes being physically active and fit. She has short cyan hair. She has a thing for games and bases her assassination attempt around playing cards and the pool. She celebrates her birthday in the anime. Her wish was to find a cure to her Highlander Syndrome, which prevents her body from aging and has kept her alive for so long that she is unsure exactly how old she is. Following her expulsion, she visits her old lover's grave to pay respects.
Otoya Takechi (武智 乙哉, Takechi Otoya)
Voiced by: Manami Numakura (Japanese); Colleen Clinkenbeard (English)
No. 8 of Class Black, dubbed the "Jack the Ripper of the 21st Century" outside of Myōjō Academy for her serial killer antics, Otoya is a sadist who hides her true nature under the guise of an extremely playful girl. She uses similarity attraction to gain Haru's trust and has an in-depth knowledge of flora. She is aroused by the sight of blood, judging herself to be similar to a spider. She is the first to be expelled, but she later escapes jail to try again, though she is quickly caught by Sumireko and is shown to be still in jail in the final episode.
Chitaru Namatame (生田目 千足, Namatame Chitaru)
Voiced by: Sachika Misawa (Japanese); Monica Rial (English)
No. 9 of Class Black, a girl with a demeanor that is both princely and mature. She has red hair and is always around Hitsugi, who she protects. She doesn't have a wish and mainly joined Class Black to find Angel's Trumpet, who killed her mentor's daughter. As such, she doesn't target Haru. She uses swords and is a master swordfighter. After stabbing Hitsugi after finding out she is Angel's Trumpet and after discovering her wish, she drinks a vial of poison to be with her. She survives and she is seen recovering in the last episode. She is the sixth to be expelled.
Nio Hashiri (走り 鳰, Hashiri Nio) / Nio Kuzunoha (葛葉 鳰, Kuzunoha Nio)
Voiced by: Yoshino Nanjō (Japanese); Lauren Landa (English)
No. 10 of Class Black, Nio is an energetic and upbeat girl with a knack for peeping into other people's businesses, though she occasionally shows a more dangerous side. Nio is the real de facto president of the class and is actually a real student of Myojo. She doesn't get involved with the assassinations until only she, Haru and Tokaku remain. She is a master of disguise and sports a red dragon tattoo on her back as a symbol of the Kuzunoha Clan, who are the vicious enemies of the Azumas. She is the eleventh and final expelled student. She is shown to have survived Tokaku's attack and continues to work under Meichi.
Sumireko Hanabusa (英 純恋子, Hanabusa Sumireko)
Voiced by: Miho Arakawa (Japanese); Bryn Apprill (English)
No. 11 of Class Black, a girl with a frail body who is the daughter of a company CEO. It is revealed that, much like Haru, she had been targeted most of her life, and had lost her limbs in an attack. Sumireko's family name is famous in Japan and has special allowances to have her own desk and chair which irritates the other students. She is the tenth student to be expelled after Haru makes her fall from a building during her assassination attempt. She goes back to her normal life following her expulsion.
Mahiru Banba (番場 真昼, Banba Mahiru) / Shinya Banba (番場 真夜, Banba Shin'ya)
Voiced by: Yuka Ōtsubo (Japanese); Mikaela Krantz (English)
No. 12 of Class Black, Mahiru is a shy and timid girl who often has troubles speaking for herself. She is easily subject to bullying, and is often defenseless. However, when the sun sets, Mahiru's split personality, Shinya, takes over. Shinya is the complete opposite of Mahiru, having an aggressive, hostile and almost unstable personality. It is hinted Shinya was born from abuse Mahiru experienced as a child, as she has a scar across her eye and is scared of bright lights. She is the eighth to be expelled after being knocked out. Following her expulsion, Mahiru lets go of Shinya, no longer needing her.
Kaiba (カイバ)
Voiced by: Tomokazu Sugita (Japanese); Robert McCollum (English)
A mysterious man who is Tokaku's teacher. Kaiba is often seen rolling dice, and has a black-and-white motif and colour scheme. He sends riddles to Tokaku via her cellphone through the series. His teaching style is rude and brash.
Ataru Mizorogi (溝呂木 辺, Mizorogi Ataru)
Voiced by: Takahiro Sakurai (Japanese); Ricco Fajardo (English)
Class Black's homeroom teacher; an eccentric, enthusiastic, and dedicated man who is unaware that the girls in his class are assassins. As the series goes on, he becomes doubtful in his skills as a teacher due to the amount of "transferals" of his students.
Meichi Yuri (百合 目一, Yuri Meichi)
Voiced by: Yoshiko Sakakibara (Japanese); Rachel Robinson (English)
The chairwoman of the school and the supervisor of Class Black, who shares the same clan as Haru.

== Media ==
=== Manga ===
Riddle Story of Devil is written by Yun Kōga and illustrated by Sunao Minakata. It was serialized in Kadokawa Shoten's Newtype magazine between the September 2012 and November 2016 issues. Kadokawa Shoten published five tankōbon volumes between July 9, 2013, and December 10, 2016. Seven Seas Entertainment released the series in North America from 2015 to 2016. The English version is available on Kadokawa's website BookWalker. A series of supplementary dōjinshi books, titled Koakuma no Riddle (小悪魔のリドル; lit. 'Small Devil's Riddle'), have been released by Minakata and Akiko Morishima. Seven volumes have been released between December 29, 2014, and December 30, 2016.

| No. | Original release date | Original ISBN | English release date | English ISBN |
|---|---|---|---|---|
| 1 | July 6, 2013 | 978-4-04-120788-8 | October 27, 2015 | 978-1-626922-00-6 |
| 2 | March 10, 2014 | 978-4-04-121056-7 | January 26, 2016 | 978-1-626922-31-0 |
| 3 | December 10, 2014 | 978-4-04-102459-1 | April 5, 2016 | 978-1-626922-54-9 |
| 4 | January 26, 2016 | 978-4-04-103446-0 | July 19, 2016 | 978-1-626922-82-2 |
| 5 | December 10, 2016 | 978-4-04-105048-4 | August 15, 2017 | 978-1-626923-38-6 |

=== Anime ===
An anime adaptation directed by Keizō Kusakawa and produced by Diomedéa aired in Japan between April 3, 2014, and June 19, 2014. The screenplay is written by Kiyoko Yoshimura and chief animation director Naomi Ide bases the character designs used in the anime on Sunao Minakata's original designs. The opening theme is "Sōshō Innocence" (創傷イノセンス; "Wounded Innocence") by Maaya Uchida, while each episode features a different ending theme sung by the main thirteen voice actresses of the anime. Episode 12 contains an insert song titled "Aogeba Tōtoshi" (仰げば尊し) sung by the main thirteen voice actresses.

The series is licensed for streaming and home video by Funimation in North America and Madman Anime in Australia, and is being simulcast by Crunchyroll outside of North America, which is also included in North America and Australia from 2022 after Funimation was unified with the Crunchyroll brand.

Anime Limited acquired the series for a release in the United Kingdom, but they later announced that they cancelled the release. In Southeast Asia and South Asia, Muse Communication licensed the series and released it via Animax Asia. The company later began streaming the series on its Muse Asia YouTube channel.

| No. | Title | Directed by | Written by | Original release date |
|---|---|---|---|---|
| 1 | "The World is Full of ___" "Sekai wa □□ ni Michiteiru" (Japanese: 世界は□□に満ちている) | Shingo Tamaki | Kiyoko Yoshimura | April 3, 2014 |
A skilled assassin named Tokaku Azuma is transferred into Myōjō Academy's "Class Black", tasked with identifying and killing a target amongst her twelve classmates, the rest of whom are also assassins. At her first homeroom class, consisting of five of the total 13 students, Tokaku finds herself drawn towards a kindly girl named Haru Ichinose, believing she may be the target. As Tokaku spends more time with Haru, who is revealed to be her roommate, she notices some knife wounds on her legs. After encountering her various classmates throughout the evening, Tokaku, who had also been tasked by her teacher, Kaiba, with solving a puzzle reading "The world is filled with (___)", becomes bewildered when Haru suggests "forgiveness" as an answer.
| 2 | "What Dwells In Your Heart?"; Transliteration: "Mune no Naka ni Iru no wa?" (Japanese: 胸の中にいるのは？) | Kazunobu Shimizu | Kiyoko Yoshimura | April 10, 2014 |
Tokaku is surprised when Kaiba replies that "forgiveness" is the correct answer to his riddle. The next school day, as more students join Class Black, Haru decides to have lunch with Tokaku, whilst the other students hear from Nio Hashiri about a meeting concerning their mission. Later that day, classmate Isuke Inukai comes around to have tea with Haru, slipping her a sleeping drug with the intent of drowning her in a bath whilst she is asleep. When Tokaku learns from Haruki Sagae that Isuke is targeting Haru, she rushes back to her room to stop Isuke, fighting against her to protect Haru. Isuke overwhelms her after Tokaku becomes hesitant to kill her, but decides to take her leave. After Tokaku regains consciousness, Haru, who was actually aware of what was happening and knows she is being targeted, asks her why she came to her rescue, stating her determination to graduate from Class Black alive to honor her family who died protecting her. That night, a meeting is held amongst the other assassins where they are briefed on their mission, which is to be kept secret from the other students and their homeroom teacher, Ataru Mizorogi. Each assassin is given one opportunity to assassinate Haru, and whoever kills Haru first will have any wish they desire granted, with those who fail their assassinations within 48 hours of giving an advance warning becoming expelled. Upon arriving at the meeting, Tokaku announces that she has defected to Haru's side and will be her protector.
| 3 | "What's Red, But Isn't Red?"; Transliteration: "Akai no ni, Akakunai no wa?" (Japanese: 赤いのに赤くないのは？) | Yasutaka Yamamoto | Masahiro Yokotani | April 17, 2014 |
With the higher ups approving of Tokaku's role as Haru's protector, the meeting comes to a close. The next day, Haru receives an advance warning that her life is being targeted and decides not to inform Tokaku, becoming determined to defend herself. Later, as Class Black visits a botanical garden, Haru is befriended by Otoya Takechi, unaware that she is the one who sent the warning. Later that night, Tokaku warns Haru not to be so naive and explains the rules concerning her assassination, but Haru states her hope that the other assassins could legitimately become her friends and none will have to die. The next day, Otoya uses an opportunity to get close to Haru and knock her out with some neurotoxin carrying flowers, before trapping Tokaku in a boiler room so she cannot interfere. Tokaku manages to escape and learns from the others that Otoya, who is revealed to be a serial killer who gets sexual pleasure from killing her victims, is the one who sent the notice. As Tokaku manages to reach their location and fight against Otoya, she is almost killed but is saved when Haru uses the same flowers to knock Otoya unconscious. With her 48-hour time limit up come the next morning, Otoya is transferred out of Class Black by the group's ringleader, Nio Hashiri.
| 4 | "What Comes Suddenly and Never Leaves?"; Transliteration: "Totsuzen Yattekite, Kaerukoto no Nai Mono wa?" (Japanese: 突然やってきて、帰ることのないものは？) | Ippei Yokota | Ayuna Fujisaki | April 24, 2014 |
As Class Black undergo mid-term exams, Tokaku and Haru hear from Chitaru Namatame, who is often seen with Hitsugi Kirigaya, that she is not targeting Haru, as she joined the Class Black for a different reason, before later hearing an urban legend from Nio about a hidden room in the library. Upon returning to their room, Tokaku and Haru discover another advance warning, also discovering some bombs has been planted in their freezer. The culprit this time around is Kōko Kaminaga, an assassin specialising in explosives who was exiled from her organisation after her teacher was killed in a failed bombing attempt, which Kaminaga herself was responsible for, as she had set the timing that the bomb would go off at too early, which killed her teacher, instead of their target. Despite knowing the danger, Tokaku accompanies Haru to the library and manages to locate the hidden room from Nio's rumors. There, Tokaku narrowly manages to protect Haru from a hidden bomb and pursues Kōko, who wanted to use her wish to quit being an assassin, managing to disarm her and stop her attempt, leading her to be transferred out of Class Black the next day.
| 5 | "What Do You Need in Order to Let a Caged Bird Free?"; Transliteration: "Kago no Tori o Sotonidasu ni wa?" (Japanese: 籠の鳥を外に出すには？) | Harume Kosaka | Kiyoko Yoshimura | May 1, 2014 |
After recalling about her past with her family, she receives another riddle from Kaiba. Meanwhile, Class Black is tasked with putting on a performance of Romeo and Juliet for the academy's culture festival, with Chitaru and Hitsugi playing the lead roles. As the classmates work on the play together, Tokaku becomes irritated by Haruki Sagae's harsh words towards Haru during bathtime. The next evening, Haruki, who desires to have her family provided for, calls out Haru to the gym, where the play is being held, and attempts to kill her with piano wire, only for Tokaku to arrive in the nick of time. As Tokaku gets the upper hand in battle, Haruki, having confirmed with Nio that her family would be provided for even if she died in the process, triggers a trap that causes the lighting structures to come down on top of them. Tokaku barely manages to rescue Haru in time whilst Haruki, having barely survived herself, accepts her defeat and is transferred out of Class Black.
| 6 | "Beautiful Flowers Have Their ___"; Transliteration: "Kirei na Hana ni wa □□ ga aru" (Japanese: 綺麗な花には□□がある) | Hisaya Takabayashi | Ayuna Fujisaki | May 8, 2014 |
As the culture festival begins, Chitaru mentions to Hitsugi about how she is searching for a killer known as Angel's Trumpet who specializes in poison, to which Hitsugi offers to help her out. Later that night, Hitsugi comes across Shiena Kenmochi, who was planning to deliver a warning to Haru, and sprays her with poison before delivering her own warning to Haru when she and Tokaku comes across the scene. The next day, as Shiena is transferred out of Class Black due to her hospitalization, the play gets underway, with Tokaku and Haru discovering many of the prop swords have been covered in poison. Spotting this, Chitaru suspects that Haru is Angel's Trumpet, the one who killed her teacher's daughter, and faces against Tokaku in an off-stage sword fight. During the battle, Hitsugi comes forward and confesses that she herself is Angel's Trumpet. Returning to the play, Hitsugi allows herself to be stabbed by Chitaru, who then learns from Nio that her wish was to leave with her once everything was over. Feeling remorse, Chitaru drinks the remainder of Hitsugi's poison and falls alongside her, with the audience unaware.
| 7 | "What Can Never Be Caught Up To?"; Transliteration: "Eien ni Oikosenai mono wa?" (Japanese: 永遠に追いこせないものは？) | Shō Ōmachi | Masahiro Yokotani | May 15, 2014 |
As Class Black prepares to go to the school's pool, Suzu Shutō straps a bomb around Haru's neck, set to explode at midnight. In order to disable it, Tokaku is tasked with finding four cards that make up a 4-digit password required to unlock the bomb, of which she is only allowed three tries. Tokaku finds the first card, a seven of diamonds, inside a watermelon, but loses her first password attempt whilst testing out a theory that the other digits are the sevens taken out of the deck they came from. Tokaku finds the second card, a joker for zero, on a searchlight, and finds the third hidden in the deck itself. Meanwhile, after Ataru shows up to congratulate Suzu on her birthday, Suzu (who has been alive since at least the Meiji era) explains to the others that she has a condition that prevents her body from aging, which led to a man she loved coming to outage and leave her, and her wish is to be able to age normally and eventually die. With less than fifteen minutes til minute, Tokaku rides in the flume in search for the fourth card, but becomes trapped inside a cage which sinks to the bottom, giving the choice of either saving Haru or herself. Haru then kisses Tokaku, which awakes Tokaku, who then witnesses Haru saving her, leaving them with only three digits to guess the password from. Tokaku presumes from Ataru's announcement that the password is likely to be Suzu's birthday, whilst Haru deduces that the actual date is that of the man she loved, managing to disarm the bomb at the last second. Accepting her loss, Suzu takes her leave from Class Black.
| 8 | "Which Gatekeeper is the One Who Lies?"; Transliteration: "Usotsuki no Monban wa Dochira?" (Japanese: 嘘つきの門番はどちら？) | Takanori Yano | Kiyoko Yoshimura | May 22, 2014 |
While Isuke contacts her mother, who trained her to become an assassin, Nio meets up with the school's chairman, Yuri, to discuss Class Black's current situation, learning that a typhoon is approaching. Meanwhile, Tokaku and Haru are approached by Shinya, the split personality of Mahiru Banba who appears during the night, leading Tokaku to believe that she will be the next one to target Haru. The next day, as Tokaku wonders what she will do when Class Black is over, she and Haru discover an advance warning, which appears to be from Mahiru/Shinya, and rush back to their dorms. However, they are confronted by Isuke, the real owner of the warning, who injures Tokaku's arm. Tokaku takes Haru to the biology room, telling her to hide there whilst she goes to confront Isuke, who calls Tokaku's bluff that she is actually unable to kill anyone. With Tokaku distracted by her fight against Isuke, Shinya appears before Haru, declaring her intent to kill her.
| 9 | "What Dwells In Your Heart? (Make-up Test)"; Transliteration: "Mune no Naka ni Aru no wa? (Tsuishi)" (Japanese: 胸の中にいるのは？（追試）) | Atsushi Nakayama | Kiyoko Yoshimura | May 29, 2014 |
It is shown that Tokaku's inability to kill came from her aunt, who followed her sister's wishes to not have Tokaku grow up to a killer like the rest of her bloodline. With Tokaku still locked in battle with Isuke, Haru attempts to escape from Shinya's violent mallet attacks on her own esteem. After receiving another message from Kaiba, Tokaku manages to stun Isuke with a taser hidden in her shoe and escape. However, she falls into a trap laid out by Isuke and is pushed off a bridge. Meanwhile, Haru is chased to the A/V room of the school, where Isuke uses a projector's light to cause Shinya to experience traumatic memories and knocks her out before turning her attention towards Haru. Tokaku, who had managed to survive her fall, finally comes to understands how her mother and aunt protected her with their lives and overcomes her hesitation, stopping Isuke and rescuing Haru. With both Isuke and Shinya defeated, the remaining classmate, Sumireko Hanabusa, prepares to make her move.
| 10 | "Who Is The Queen?"; Transliteration: "Jo-ō wa Dare?" (Japanese: 女王はだれ？) | Shingo Tamaki | Masahiro Yokotani | June 5, 2014 |
With only Tokaku, Haru, Nio, and Sumireko remaining in Class Black, Sumireko gives Haru an invitation to a tea party, claiming it not to be an advance notice. Meanwhile, Otoya breaks out of prison and sneaks into the dorms to try and target Haru again, but is stopped by Sumireko, who crushes Otoya's scissors in her hand with little effort. Later that night, Haru and Tokaku arrive at the tea party, where they discover robotic puppets of all the other classmates, as well as the restrained Otoya. After explaining how she wants to prove she is a stronger "queen" than Haru, Sumireko delivers her notice and has her puppets attack Tokaku, giving her a selection of guns to fight against. After being prevented from separating herself from the others to target Haru, Sumireko reveals she has powerful robotic limbs and launches a fierce attack against Haru. In the ensuing battle, Otoya breaks free and manages to disable one of Sumireko's arms, only for her to replace it with another weapon, with Otoya once again captured by Nio. As Tokaku becomes cornered, Haru lures Sumireko away from her and uses her robotic limbs to her own advantage, knocking her off the side of a building. After receiving another text from Kaiba asking "Who is the queen?", Tokaku asks Haru what Sumireko meant by her words about her being a "queen bee", but Haru simply says it is not the time to tell her yet.
| 11 | "How to Distinguish a "Congratulation" from a "Curse""; Transliteration: ""Kotohogi" to "Noroi" no Miwake-kata" (Japanese: 『祝(ことほぎ)』と『呪(のろい)』の見分け方) | Yasumi Mikamoto | Kiyoko Yoshimura | June 12, 2014 |
With all the other assassins defeated, Nio announces there will be an orientation held at midnight revealing the secret behind Class Black, implying that Haru already knows something. That night, Tokaku and Haru arrive at the orientation, where they are greeted by Yuri, who reveals Class Black was designed as a test to see if Haru could survive against twelve assassins and become a successor for her clan, who control most of the world. Yuri implies that Haru, consciously or not, allegedly has the power to manipulate and control others into protecting her, which Haru refuses to acknowledge. As Haru runs off in denial, Yuri asks Tokaku to think of a wish she wants granted for winning Class Black. That night, as Tokaku feels she had been manipulated the entire time, with no way for Haru to prove otherwise, Kaiba tells her that all of the riddles he had sent her have no "right" answers, tasking Tokaku with finding her own answers. Meanwhile, after Haru asks Yuri to let her leave the clan and live a normal life, Nio takes her to their clan's cemetery, which Myōjō Academy was built upon, giving her some time to reflect on things. After spending time with her family's grave, Haru is approached by Tokaku, who delivers her own advance warning and draws her sword against her.
| 12 | "Therefore, the World is Full of ____"; Transliteration: "Yueni Sekai wa □□ ni Michiteiru" (Japanese: 故に、世界は□□に満ちている) | Harume Kosaka | Kiyoko Yoshimura | June 19, 2014 |
As Tokaku begins her attack, Haru is suddenly dragged off by another Tokaku, who claims the other Tokaku is actually Nio using hypnotic suggestions to take on her appearance. The two Tokakus soon battle against each other with the real Tokaku managing to overcome her fake and stab her. Haru then charges against Tokaku, but ends up becoming stabbed herself, leaving Tokaku devastated, feeling the one wish she has can no longer be granted. As the end of the school year comes, it is revealed that both Haru and Nio had survived their attacks, with Haru becoming the sole graduate of Class Black. With all the other assassins returning to their regular lives, Tokaku sends one last reply to Kaiba before joining Haru in delivering everyone's diplomas. After the credits, Kaiba receives a text message and smiles, though the content of the message is not revealed.
| 13 (OVA) | "Who's the Winner? (Surprise Test)"; Transliteration: "Shōsha wa Dare? (Nukiuchi Tesuto)" (Japanese: 勝者はだれ？（抜き打ちテスト）) | Toshikatsu Tokoro | Ayuna Fujisaki | December 17, 2014 |
Nio strands everyone in Class Black on a remote island and initiates a scramble game, in which all the other students must try to obtain a charm from Haru using weapons found on the island without losing their own charms. As the game goes on, many students are eliminated and brought to the loser's area for a barbecue, resulting in a five-way struggle between Haru, Tokaku, and the remaining participants. In the end, Haru's charm goes flying and ends up in the hands of Ataru, who is declared the winner of the contest.
