= Keizō Kusakawa =

Japanese anime director

Keizō Kusakawa (草川 啓造, Kusakawa Keizō) is a Japanese anime storyboard artist and director who has mainly worked as a director with works from Seven Arcs and Diomedéa (from 2013 onwards).

== Anime involved in ==
- Petite Cossette (2004) – 3D Cinematography
- Tsukuyomi -Moon Phase- (2004) – Storyboard, Episode Director, Opening Director
- Magical Girl Lyrical Nanoha (2004) – Episode Director (eps 1,11/OP)
- Magical Girl Lyrical Nanoha A's (2005) – Director, Storyboard (ep 1), Episode Director (ep 1)
- Inukami! (2006) – Director
- Magical Girl Lyrical Nanoha Strikers (2007) – Director
- Inukami! The Movie (2007) – Director
- Sekirei (2008) – Director
- Asura Cryin' (2009) – Director
- Asura Cryin' 2 (2009) – Director
- Sekirei: Pure Engagement (2010) – Director
- Dog Days (2011) – Director
- Ro-Kyu-Bu! (2011) – Director
- Campione! (2012) – Director
- Problem Children Are Coming from Another World, Aren't They? (2013) – Chief Director
- Ro-Kyu-Bu! SS (2013) – Chief Director
- Day Break Illusion (2013) – Director
- Riddle Story of Devil (2014) – Director
- Kantai Collection (2015) – Director
- Unlimited Fafnir (2015) – Chief Director
- KanColle: The Movie (2016) – Director
- Fuuka (2017) – Director
- Aho-Girl (2017) – Chief Director
- Action Heroine Cheer Fruits (2017) – Director
- Happy Sugar Life (2018) – Chief Director
- Ahiru no Sora (2019–2020) – Chief Director
- Parallel World Pharmacy (2022) ー Director
- Hello, I am a Witch, and My Crush Wants Me to Make a Love Potion! (2026) ー Director
