= 2016 in anime =

Events in 2016 in anime.

== Awards ==
- 10th Seiyu Awards

== Releases ==
=== Films ===
A list of feature-length anime films that debuted in theaters between 1 January and 31 December 2016.

Release date	Title	Studio	Director	Running time (minutes)	Notes	Ref
8 January	Kizumonogatari Part 1: Tekketsu	Shaft	Akiyuki Shinbo; Tatsuya Oishi	64	The title translates to Kizumonogatari I Blood and Iron. The first in a trilogy, followed by Kizumonogatari II Nekketsu-hen and Kizumonogatari III Reiketsu-hen. It is part of the Monogatari series.	
9 January	Garakowa -Restore the World-	A-1 Pictures	Masashi Ishihama	67	Also known as Glass no Hana to Kowasu Sekai.	
16 January	Sinbad: Mahō no Lamp to Ugoku Shima	Nippon Animation	Shinpei Miyashita	50	Also known as Sinbad: The Magical Lamp and the Moving Island, the film is the second in a trilogy, the first being Sinbad: Sora Tobu Hime to Himitsu no Shima.	
23 January	Persona 3 The Movie: No. 4, Winter of Rebirth	A-1 Pictures	Tomohisa Taguchi	105	The fourth film in the Persona 3 film series.	
6 February	New Initial D the Movie Legend 3: Half Awake, Half Asleep	Sanzigen; Liden Films	Masamitsu Hidaka, Tomohito Naka	60	The third film in the Initial D anime film series. Alternatively titled Shin Gekijō-ban Initial D Legend 3 -Yumeutsutsu-.	
13 February	Selector Destructed WIXOSS	J.C. Staff	Takuya Satō	91	A film in the Selector Infected WIXOSS series.	
20 February	Dōkyūsei	A-1 Pictures	Shouko Nakamura	60	Based on the manga Classmates by Asumiko Nakamura.	
27 February	Gekijōban Tantei Opera Milky Holmes: Gyakushū no Milky Holmes	J.C. Staff	Makoto Moriwaki, Hiroaki Sakurai	70	The title translates as Detective Opera Milky Holmes the Movie: Milky Holmes' Counterattack. Part of the Tantei Opera Milky Holmes series.	
11 March	Shimajirō to Ehon no Kuni ni	Benesse Corporation	Isamu Hirabayashi	61	The forth film of Shimajiro film series. Also known as Shimajiro in Bookland.	
12 March	Digimon Adventure tri: Ketsui	Toei Animation	Keitaro Motonaga	88	The second film of Digimon Adventure tri. film series.	
2 April	Tamayura: Sotsugyō Shashin Dai-4-bu Asa -Ashita-	TYO Animations	Junichi Sato	58	The title translates as Tamayura: Graduation Photos Part 4: Morning -Tomorrow-. The fourth and final film of the four-part Tamayura movie series.	
23 April	Yu-Gi-Oh!: The Dark Side of Dimensions	Gallop	Satoshi Kuwabara	130	Also known as Yū☆Gi☆Ō Za Dāku Saido Obu Dimenshonzu. The third film of Yu-Gi-Oh! Series.	
23 April	Zutto Mae Kara Suki Deshita: Kokuhaku Jikkō Iinkai	Qualia Animation	Tetsuya Yanagisawa	60	Based on the "Kokuhaku Jikkō Iinkai ~Renai Series~" Vocaloid song project by HoneyWorks.	
6 May	Ajin: Shōtotsu	Polygon Pictures	Hiroyuki Seshita	106	The second film in the Ajin film trilogy.	
21 May	Garo: Divine Flame	MAPPA	Yuichiro Hayashi	78		
21 May	Why We Live: The Priest Rennyo and the Yoshizaki Fire	Studio Deen	Hideaki Oba	83	Also known as Naze Ikiru -Rennyo Shōnin to Yoshizaki Enjō-. Based on the Buddhist text Naze Ikiru by Kentetsu Takamori.	
25 June	Mobile Suit Gundam Thunderbolt: December Sky	Sunrise	Kō Matsuo	70	Also known as Kidō Senshi Gundam Thunderbolt: December Sky.	
9 July	Kingsglaive: Final Fantasy XV	Square Enix	Takeshi Nozue	115	Sequel to the ONA, Brotherhood: Final Fantasy XV.	
23 July	Accel World: Infinite Burst	Sunrise	Masakazu Obara	82	Also known as Akuseru Warudo Infinito Bāsuto.	
23 July	One Piece Film: Gold	Toei Animation	Hiroaki Miyamoto	120		
19 August	Kizumonogatari Part 2: Nekketsu	Shaft	Akiyuki Shinbo; Tatsuya Oishi	64	The title translates to Kizumonogatari II Passionate Blood. The second in a trilogy, followed by Kizumonogatari III Reiketsu-hen. It is part of the Monogatari series.	
26 August	Your Name	CoMix Wave Films	Makoto Shinkai	107	Also known as Kimi no Na wa.	
3 September	Kuroko's Basketball: Winter Cup Compilation ~Shadow and Light~	Production I.G	Shunsuke Tada	87	Also known as Kuroko no Basuke: Winter Cup Sōshū-hen ~Kage to Hikari~. This is the first film in a trilogy of compilation films that compile the anime television's Winter Cup episodes.	
3 September	Planetarian: Hoshi no Hito	David Production	Naokatsu Tsuda	117	The title translates to Planetarian: Man of the Stars.	
9 September	Yowamushi Pedal: Spare Bike	TMS/8PAN	Osamu Nabeshima	60		
17 September	A Silent Voice	Kyoto Animation	Naoko Yamada	130	Also known as Koe no Katachi.	
23 September	Ajin: Shōgeki	Polygon Pictures	Hiroyuki Seshita	105	The third film in the Ajin film trilogy.	
24 September	Digimon Adventure tri: Kokuhaku	Toei Animation	Keitaro Motonaga	105	The third film of Digimon Adventure tri. film series.	
8 October	Kuroko's Basketball: Winter Cup Compilation ~Beyond the Tears~	Production I.G	Shunsuke Tada	87	Also known as Kuroko no Basuke: Winter Cup Sōshū-hen ~Namida no Saki e~. This is the second film in a trilogy of compilation films that compile the anime television's Winter Cup episodes.	
14 October	GANTZ:O	Digital Frontier	Keiichi Sato; Yasushi Kawamura	96		
12 November	In This Corner of the World	MAPPA	Sunao Katabuchi	129	Also known as Kono Sekai no Katasumi ni.	
26 November	KanColle: The Movie	Diomedéa	Keizō Kusakawa	95	Also known as Gekijō-ban KanKore.	
3 December	Kuroko's Basketball: Winter Cup Compilation ~Crossing the Door~	Production I.G	Shunsuke Tada	88	Also known as Kuroko no Basuke: Winter Cup Sōshū-hen ~Tobira no Mukō~. This is the third film in a trilogy of compilation films that compile the anime television's Winter Cup episodes.	
17 December	I wait for the moment that you love me. Confession Executive Committee	Qualia Animation	Tetsuya Yanagisawa	63	Also known as Suki ni Naru Sono Shunkan o. ~Kokuhaku Jikkō Iinkai~.	
23 December	Pop in Q	Toei Animation	Naoki Miyahara	95	Also known as PoppinQ.	
31 December	Kabaneri of the Iron Fortress	Wit Studio	Tetsurō Araki	107	Also known as Kōtetsujō no Kabaneri, this is a compilation film compiling the first part of the anime television of the same name.	

=== Television series ===
A list of anime television series that debuted between 1 January and 31 December 2016.

First run start and end dates	Title	Eps	Studio	Director	Original title	Ref
5 January - 22 March	Prince of Stride Alternative	12	Madhouse	Atsuko Ishizuka		
6 January - 24 March	HaruChika: Haruta to Chika wa Seishun Suru	12	P.A. Works	Masakazu Hashimoto		
6 January - 30 March	Sushi Police	13	KOO-KI	Tatsushi Momen		
7 January - 27 September	Active Raid	24	Production IMS	Gorō Taniguchi; Noriaki Akitaya	Active Raid -Kidō Kyōshūshitsu Dai-Hakkei- Active Raid: Mobile Assault Division, Unit 8	
7 January - 30 June	Assassination Classroom	25	Lerche	Seiji Kishi	Ansatsu Kyōshitsu season 2	
7 January - 31 March	Dagashi Kashi	12	Feel	Shigehito Takayanagi		
7 January - 25 March	ERASED	12	A-1 Pictures	Tomohiko Itō	Boku Dake ga Inai Machi	
7 January - 24 March	Girls Beyond the Wasteland	12	Project No.9	Takuya Satō	Shōjotachi wa Kōya o Mezasu; ~Girls beyond the youth KOYA~	
7 January - 31 March	Myriad Colors Phantom World	13	Kyoto Animation	Tatsuya Ishihara	Musaigen no Fantomu Wārudo	
7 January - 25 March	Norn9	12	Kinema Citrus; Orange	Takao Abo	Norn9: Norn + Nonette	
7 January - 25 March	Ojisan to Marshmallow	12	Creators in Pack	Hisayoshi Hirasawa; Noriyoshi Sasaki	Ojisan and Marshmallow	
7 January - 31 March	Phantasy Star Online 2: The Animation	12	Telecom Animation Film	Keiichiro Kawaguchi		
8 January - 25 March	Divine Gate	12	Studio Pierrot	Noriyuki Abe	Dibain Gēto	
8 January - 25 March	Pandora in the Crimson Shell: Ghost Urn	12	Studio Gokumi; AXsiZ	Munenori Nawa	Kōkaku no Pandora - Ghost Urn	
8 January - 25 March	Please Tell Me! Galko-chan	12	Feel	Keiichiro Kawaguchi	Oshiete! Galko-chan	
8 January - 25 March	Reikenzan: Hoshikuzu-tachi no Utage	12	Studio Deen	Iku Suzuki		
8 January - 25 March	Sekkō Boys	12	Liden Films	Tomoki Takuno	Sekkō Bōizu	
8 January - 1 April	Shōwa Genroku Rakugo Shinjū	13	Studio Deen	Mamoru Hatakeyama	Shōwa Genroku Rakugo Shinjū	
8 January - 29 January	Tabi Machi Late Show	4	CoMix Wave Films	Yuu Numata	Tabi-gai reitoshō	
9 January - 26 March	BBK/BRNK	12	Sanzigen	Daizen Komatsuda	Bubuki Buranki	
9 January - 26 March	Durarara!!×2 Ketsu	12	Shuka	Takahiro Omori	Durarara!!×2 The Third Arc	
9 January - 26 March	Gate	12	A-1 Pictures	Takahiko Kyōgoku	Gate: Jieitai Kanochi nite, Kaku Tatakaeri - Enryuu-hen	
9 January - 26 March	Luck & Logic	12	Doga Kobo	Koichi Chigira; Takashi Naoya	Raku en Rojikku	
10 January - 27 March	Dimension W	12	3Hz; Orange	Kanta Kamei		
10 January - 26 June	Nijiiro Days	24	Production Reed	Tetsurō Amino; Tomihiko Ohkubo	Rainbow Days	
10 January - 27 March	Nurse Witch Komugi-chan R	12	Tatsunoko Production	Keiichiro Kawaguchi		
10 January - 27 March	Ooya-san wa Shishunki!	12	Seven Arcs	Yuki Ogawa	Landlord is in Puberty	
10 January - 27 March	Schwarzesmarken	12	Ixtl; Liden Films	Tetsuya Watanabe	Shuvarutsesumāken	
11 January - 28 March	Aokana: Four Rhythm Across the Blue	12	Gonzo	Fumitoshi Oizaki	Ao no Kanata no Four Rhythm	
11 January - 28 March	Grimgar of Fantasy and Ash	12	A-1 Pictures	Ryosuke Nakamura	Hai to Gensō no Grimgar or Grimgar le Monde des cendres et de fantaisie	
11 January - 29 March	A Simple Thinking About Blood Type	12	Assez Finaud Fabric; Feel; Zexcs	Yoshihisa Oyama	Ketsuekigata-kun! season 4	
11 January - 28 March	Snow White with the Red Hair	12	Bones	Masahiro Ando	Akagami no Shirayuki-hime season 2	
11 January - 29 March	Teekyū	12	Millepensee	Shin Itagaki	Season 7	
11 January - 28 March	Undefeated Bahamut Chronicle	12	Lerche	Masaomi Ando	Saijaku Muhai no Bahamut	
11 January - 3 April	Yamishibai: Japanese Ghost Stories	13	ILCA	Takashi Taniguchi; Tomohisa Ishikawa	Season 3	
12 January - 29 March	Mahou Shoujo Nante Mouiidesukara	12	Pine Jam	Kazuhiro Yoneda	I've Had Enough of Being a Magical Girl	
12 January - 29 March	Teekyu (season 7)	12	Millepensee	Shin Itagaki		
13 January - 16 March	Kono Subarashii Sekai ni Shukufuku o!	10	Studio Deen	Takaomi Kanasaki	Give Blessings to This Wonderful World	
16 January - 9 April	Ajin: Demi-Human	13	Polygon Pictures	Hiroyuki Seshita		
21 January - 24 March	Ganbare! Lulu Lolo - Tiny Twin Bears	10	Fanworks	Yūji Umoto		
5 February - 26 February	Kono Danshi, Mahō ga Oshigoto Desu.	4	CoMix Wave Films	Soubi Yamamoto	This Boy, Works With Magic	
6 February - 25 March 2017	Rilu Rilu Fairilu ~Yōsei no Door~	59	Studio Deen	Sakura Gojō	Rilu Rilu Fairilu: The Fairies' Door	
7 February 2016 - 29 January 2017	Maho Girls PreCure!	50	Toei Animation	Masato Mitsuka	Mahō Tsukai Precure!	
3 March - 28 April	Itachi Shinden-hen	7	Studio Pierrot	Hayato Date	Itachi Shinden Book: Light and Darkness	
4 March - 25 March	She and Her Cat	4	Liden Films	Kazuya Sakamoto	Kanojo to Kanojo no Neko: Everything Flows	
1 April - 23 June	Kagewani: Shō	13	Tomovies	Tomoya Takashima	Kagewani -II-	
1 April - 18 June	The Lost Village	12	Diomedéa	Tsutomu Mizushima	Mayoiga	
1 April - 24 June	Space Patrol Luluco	13	Studio Trigger	Hiroyuki Imaishi	Uchū Patrol Luluco	
1 April - 24 June	Terra Formars Revenge	13	Liden Films; TYO Animations	Michio Fukuda		
1 April - 24 June	Ushio and Tora	13	MAPPA; Studio VOLN	Satoshi Nishimura	Ushio to Tora	
2 April - 24 September	Ace Attorney	24	A-1 Pictures	Ayumu Watanabe	Gyakuten Saiban	
2 April - 18 June	The Asterisk War	12	A-1 Pictures	Manabu Ono; Kenji Seto	Season 2	
2 April - 23 December	JoJo's Bizarre Adventure: Diamond Is Unbreakable	39	David Production	Naokatsu Tsuda	JoJo no Kimyō na Bōken Daiyamondo wa Kudakenai	
3 April - 17 June	Concrete Revolutio: Chōjin Gensō The Last Song	11	Bones	Seiji Mizushima		
3 April - 24 September	Endride	24	Brain's Base	Keiji Gotoh	Endoraido	
3 April - 19 June	Kuma Miko: Girl Meets Bear	12	Kinema Citrus; EMT Squared	Kiyoshi Matsuda		
3 April - 25 September	Macross Delta	26	Satelight	Shōji Kawamori; Kenji Yasuda	Macross Δ	
3 April - 11 September	Mobile Suit Gundam Unicorn RE:0096	22	Sunrise	Kazuhiro Furuhashi		
3 April - 26 June	My Hero Academia	13	Bones	Kenji Nagasaki	Boku no Hero Academia	
4 April - 19 December	Age 12	24	OLM	Seiki Taichū	12-Sai. ~Chiccha na Mune no Tokimeki~; Age 12: A Little Heart-Pounding	
4 April - 20 June	Bakuon!!	12	TMS/8PAN	Junji Nishimura		
4 April - 19 June	Hundred	12	Production IMS	Tomoki Kobayashi	Handoreddo	
4 April - 27 June	Pan de Peace!	13	Asahi Production	Hatsuki Tsuji	Peace Through Bread!	
4 April -19 September	Re:Zero kara Hajimeru Isekai Seikatsu	25	White Fox	Masaharu Watanabe	Re: Life in a different world from zero	
4 April - 27 June	Seisen Cerberus: Ryūkoku no Fatalite	13	Bridge	Nobuhiro Kondo		
5 April - 28 June	Hakuōki: Otogisōshi	13	DLE Inc.	Parako Shinohara		
5 April - 21 June	Joker Game	12	Production I.G	Kazuya Nomura	Jōkā Gēmu	
6 April - 29 June	Bishōjo Yūgi Unit Crane Geer	13	Kyotoma	Mr. Milkman	Beautiful Girl Play Unit Crane Game Girls	
6 April - 8 June	Super Lovers	10	Studio Deen	Shinji Ishihira		
6 April - 29 March 2017	Twin Star Exorcists	50	Studio Pierrot	Tomohisa Taguchi	Sōsei no Onmyōji	
7 April - 23 June	Bungō Stray Dogs	12	Bones	Takuya Igarashi	Bungō Sutorei Doggusu	
7 April - 29 September	Kuromukuro	26	P.A. Works	Tensai Okamura		
7 April - 23 June	And you thought there is never a girl online?	12	Project No.9	Shinsuke Yanagi	Netoge no Yome wa Onna no Ko Janai to Omotta?	
7 April - 30 June	Onigiri	13	Pierrot Plus	Takashi Yamamoto		
7 April - 23 June	Unhappy	12	Silver Link	Shin Ōnuma	Anne Happy	
8 April - 1 July	Haven't You Heard? I'm Sakamoto	12	Studio Deen	Shinji Takamatsu	Sakamoto desu ga?	
8 April - 30 June	Kabaneri of the Iron Fortress	12	Wit Studio	Tetsurō Araki	Kōtetsujō no Kabaneri	
8 April - 24 June	Shōnen Maid	12	8-Bit	Yusuke Yamamoto	Shōnen Meido	
9 April - 25 June	Flying Witch	12	J.C.Staff	Katsushi Sakurabi	Furaingu Witchi	
9 April - 25 June	Hai-Furi	12	Production IMS	Yuu Nobuta	Haisukūru Furīto	
9 April - 25 June	Kiznaiver	12	Studio Trigger	Hiroshi Kobayashi	Kizunaībā	
9 April - 24 September	Rin-ne	25	Brain's Base	Seiki Sugawara	Kyōkai no Rinne season 2	
9 April - 25 June	Tanaka-kun wa Itsumo Kedaruge	12	Silver Link	Shinya Kawamo	Tanaka is Always Listless	
10 April - 26 June	Sansha San'yō	12	Doga Kobo	Yasuhiro Kimura	Sansha San'yō	
12 April - 28 June	Usakame	12	Millepensee	Shin Itagaki		
12 April - 28 June	Wagamama High Spec	12	AXsiZ	Satoshi Shimizu	Wagahigh, Selfish High Spec	
16 April - 18 June	Big Order	10	Asread	Nobuharu Kamanaka	Biggu Ōdā	
16 April - 2 July	Magi: Adventure of Sinbad	13	Lay-duce	Yoshikazu Miyao	Magi: Sinbad no Bōken	
23 April 2016 - 25 March 2017	Kamiwaza Wanda	47	TMS	Mitsuo Hashimoto		
28 June - 21 September	Fukigen na Mononokean	13	Pierrot Plus	Akira Iwanaga	The Morose Mononokean	
1 July - 16 September	Berserk	12	GEMBA; Millepensee; Liden Films	Shin Itagaki	Beruseruku	
1 July - 23 September	Momokuri	13	Satelight	Yoshimasa Hiraike		
2 July - 24 September	B-Project: Kodou*Ambitious	12	A-1 Pictures	Eiji Suganuma		
2 July - 18 December	Days	24	MAPPA	Kônosuke Uda		
2 July - 17 September	First Love Monster	12	Studio Deen	Takayuki Inagaki	Hatsukoi Monster	
2 July - 24 September	Food Wars! Shokugeki no Soma: The Second Plate	13	J.C. Staff	Yoshitomo Yonetani	Shokugeki no Sōma: Ni no Sara	
2 July - 24 September	Love Live! Sunshine!!	13	Sunrise	Kazuo Sakai	Rabu Raibu! Sanshain!!	
2 July - 24 September	ReLIFE	13	TMS/Double Eagle	Tomo Kosaka	Riraifu	
2 July - 24 September	Rewrite	13	8-Bit	Tensho		
3 July - 25 September	Tales of Zestiria the X	13	Ufotable	Haruo Sotozaki	Teiruzu Obu Zesutiria Za Kurosu	
3 July - 21 August	The Heroic Legend of Arslan: Dust Storm Dance	8	Liden Films	Noriyuki Abe	Arslan Senki: Fūjin Ranbu	
3 July - 25 September	Orange	13	Telecom Animation Film; TMS Entertainment	Hiroshi Hamasaki		
4 July - 26 September	Bananya	13	TMS Entertainment	Kyō Yatate		
4 July - 26 September	D.Gray-man Hallow	13	TMS/8PAN	Yoshiharu Ashino		
4 July - 26 March 2018	Puzzle & Dragons X	89	Studio Pierrot	Hajime Kamegaki	Pazudora Kurosu	
4 July - 26 December	Saiki Kusuo no Psi-nan	120	J.C. Staff; Egg Firm	Hiroaki Sakurai	Saiki Kusuo no Sai-nan	
4 July - 19 September	Show By Rock!! Short!!	12	Bones	Takahiro Ikezoe		
4 July - 19 September	Sweetness and Lightning	12	TMS/3xCube	Tarou Iwasaki	Amaama to Inazuma	
4 July - 19 September	Taboo-Tattoo	12	J.C. Staff	Takashi Watanabe	Taboo Tattoo	
5 July - 27 September	Cheer Boys!!	12	Brain's Base	Ai Yoshimura	Cheer Danshi!!	
5 July - 20 September	Fudanshi Kōkō Seikatsu	12	EMT Squared	Toshikatsu Tokoro	Rotten Boys' High School Life	
5 July - 20 September	Hybrid x Heart Magias Academy Ataraxia	12	Production IMS	Hiroyuki Furukawa	Masō Gakuen Haiburiddo Hāto	
5 July - 21 September	Scared Rider Xechs	12	Satelight	Hideto Komori	Sukāreddo Raidā Zekusu	
5 July - 20 September	Servamp	12	Brain's Base	Itto Sara; Hideaki Nakano	Sāvanpu	
6 July - 21 September	Fate/kaleid liner Prisma Illya 3rei!!	12	Silver Link	Shin Ōnuma; Masato Jinbo; Ken Takahashi	Fate/ kaleid rainā, purizuma ☆ Iriya dorai!!	
6 July - 28 September	Tsukiuta. The Animation	13	Studio Pierrot	Itsuro Kawasaki		
7 July - 22 September	This Art Club Has a Problem!	12	Feel	Kei Oikawa	Kono Bijutsu-bu niwa Mondai ga Aru!	
7 July - 22 September	OZMAFIA!!	12	Creators in Pack	Hisayoshi Hirasawa		
7 July - 24 November	Regalia: The Three Sacred Stars	13	Actas	Susumu Tosaka	Regaria Za Surī Seikuriddo Sutāzu	
8 July - 1 October	91 Days	12	Shuka	Hiro Kaburaki		
8 July - 22 September	Amanchu!	12	J.C.Staff	Junichi Sato; Kenichi Kasai		
8 July - 23 September	Handa-kun	12	Diomedéa	Yoshitaka Koyama		
8 July - 23 September	Cute High Earth Defense Club LOVE! LOVE!	12	Studio Comet	Tomoko Miyakawa; Atsuko Takahashi	Binan Kōkō Chikyū Bōei-bu Love! Love!	
9 July - 30 September	Alderamin on the Sky	13	Madhouse	Tetsuo Ichimura	Nejimaki Seirei Senki: Tenkyō no Alderamin	
9 July - 24 September	Ange Vierge	12	Silver Link	Masafumi Tamura	Anju Vieruju	
9 July - 24 September	Hitori no Shita the outcast	12	Pandanium	Wang Xin; Kazuhiro Toda; Mitsuo Mori		
9 July - 24 September	Qualidea Code	12	A-1 Pictures	Kenichi Kawamura	Kuoridia Kōdo	
11 July - 26 September	Danganronpa 3: The End of Kibōgamine Gakuen - Mirai-hen	12	Lerche	Seiji Kishi	"Danganronpa 3: The End of Hope's Peak High School - Future Arc"	
12 July - 27 September	Active Raid: Kidō Kyōshūshitsu Dai-Hakkei 2nd	12	Production IMS; Orange	Gorō Taniguchi	Akutivu Reido Kidō Kyōshūshitsu Daihachigakari	
12 July - 27 September	Mob Psycho 100	12	Bones	Yuzuru Tachikawa	Mobu Saiko Hyaku	
14 July - 22 September	Battery	11	Zero-G	Tomomi Mochizuki	Batterī	
14 July - 29 September	Danganronpa 3: The End of Kibōgamine Gakuen - Zetsubō-hen	13	Lerche	Seiji Kishi	"Danganronpa 3: The End of Hope's Peak High School - Despair Arc"	
28 August - 18 September	The Seven Deadly Sins: Signs of Holy War	4	A-1 Pictures	Tomokazu Tokoro	Nanatsu no Taizai: Seisen no Shirushi	
1 October - 17 December	BBK/BRNK: Hoshi no Kyojin	12	Sanzigen	Daizen Komatsuda	BBK/BRNK Season 2	
1 October - 30 September 2017	Digimon Universe: App Monsters	52	Toei Animation	Gou Koga	Dejimon Yunibāsu Apuri Monsutāzu	
1 October - 17 December	Magical Girl Raising Project	12	Lerche	Hiroyuki Hashimoto	Mahō Shōjo Ikusei Keikaku	
1 October - 17 December	Shūmatsu no Izetta	12	Ajia-do Animation Works	Masaya Fujimori	Izetta, Die Letzte Hexe, "Izetta of the End"	
1 October - 18 March 2017	Time Bokan 24	24	Tatsunoko Productions	Takayuki Inagaki	Taimubokan Nijū Yon	
1 October - 24 December	Uta no Prince-sama Maji LOVE Legend Star	13	A-1 Pictures	Takeshi Furuta	Uta no Prince-sama Season 4	
2 October - 24 September 2017	Chi's Sweet Home	51	Marza Animation Planet	Kiminori Kusano	Chīzu Suīto Hōmu	
2 October - 25 December	Magic-kyun Renaissance	13	Sunrise	Mitsue Yamazaki	Maji-kyun! Runessansu	
2 October 2016 - 2 April 2017	Mobile Suit Gundam: Iron-Blooded Orphans	25	Sunrise	Tatsuyuki Nagai	Kidō Senshi Gundam: Tekketsu no Orphans Season 2	
2 October -	Monster Hunter Stories: Ride On	48	David Production	Mitsuru Hongo	Monsutā Hantā Sutōrīzu Raido On	
2 October - 18 December	Show By Rock!!#	12	Bones	Takahiro Ikezoe		
2 October - 2 July 2017	Tiger Mask W	38	Toei Animation	Toshiaki Komura	Tiger Mask Double	
3 October - 18 December	Idol Memories	12	Seven Arcs Pictures	Katsuya Kikuchi	Aidorumemorīzu	
3 October - 19 December	Magic of Stella	12	Silver Link	Shinya Kawamo	Stella no Mahō	
3 October - 19 December	Touken Ranbu: Hanamaru	12	Doga Kobo	Takashi Naoya		
4 October - 29 December	Matoi the Sacred Slayer	12	White Fox	Masayuki Sakoi	Sōshin Shōjo Matoi	
4 October - 20 December	Natsume Yūjin-Chō Go	11	Shuka	Takahiro Omori	Natsume's Book of Friends Season 5	
4 October - 28 March 2017	Nobunaga no Shinobi	26	TMS/V1 Studio	Akitaro Daichi	"Ninja Girl & Samurai Master"	
4 October - 11 December	Soul Buster	12	Studio Pierrot	Kōbun Shizuno; Odahiro Watanabe	Sourubasutā	
4 October - 27 March 2017	Trickster	24	TMS Entertainment; Shin-Ei Animation	Masahiro Mukai	Trickster - Edogawa Ranpo 'Shōnen Tantei-dan' Yori	
5 October - 28 December	Brave Witches	12	Silver Link	Kazuhiro Takamura	Strike Witches season 3	
5 October - 22 March 2017	Nanbaka	25	Satelight	Shinji Takamatsu		
5 October - 21 December	Nazotokine	12	Tengu Kobou	Naoya Fukushi		
5 October - 21 December	Teekyu (season 8)	12	Millepensee	Shin Itagaki		
6 October - 22 December	Bungō Stray Dogs	12	Bones	Takuya Igarashi	Bungō Sutorei Doggusu	
6 October - 29 December	Flip Flappers	13	Studio 3Hz	Kiyotaka Oshiyama	Furippu Furappāzu	
6 October - 22 December	Kiss Him, Not Me	12	Brain's Base	Hiroshi Ishiodori	Watashi ga Motete Dōsunda	
6 October - 28 December	Sound! Euphonium	13	Kyoto Animation	Tatsuya Ishihara	Hibike! Euphonium season 2	
6 October - 22 December	Yuri!!! on Ice	12	MAPPA	Sayo Yamamoto		
7 October 2016 - 31 March 2017	All Out!!	25	TMS Entertainment; Madhouse	Kenichi Shimizu		
7 October - 23 December	Drifters	12	Hoods Drifters Studio	Kenichi Suzuki	Dorifutāzu	
8 October - 24 December	Ajin: Demi-Human	13	Polygon Pictures	Hiroyuki Seshita	Ajin: Demi-Human Season 2	
8 October 2016 - 1 April 2017	Classicaloid	25	Sunrise	Yoichi Fujita	Kurashikaroido	
8 October - 10 December	Haikyū!! Karasuno High School vs Shiratorizawa Academy	10	Production I.G	Susumu Mitsunaka	Haikyū!! Season 3	
8 October 2016 - 18 March 2017	March Comes in Like a Lion	22	Shaft	Akiyuki Shinbo; Kenjirō Okada	Sangatsu no Lion	
9 October - 25 December	Occultic;Nine	12	A-1 Pictures	Kyōhei Ishiguro; Miyuki Kuroki	Okarutikku Nain	
9 October - 25 December	Udon no Kuni no Kiniro Kemari	12	Liden Films	Yoshihide Ibata	The Udon Country's Golden Furball, Poco's Udon World	
14 October - 23 December	The Great Passage	11	Zexcs	Toshimasa Kuroyanagi	Fune o Amu	
22 October	Luger Code 1951	1	Studio Deen	Shinya Takahashi	Rugākōdo 1951	

=== OVA/ONA ===
A list of anime that debuted on DVD, Blu-ray, online, or in other media during 2016.

Release date	Title	Eps	Studio	Director	Notes	Ref
4 January	Nisekoi	1	Shaft	Akiyuki Shinbo; Yukihiro Miyamoto; Naoyuki Tatsuwa	Bundled with volume 21 of the manga. The OAD adapts bonus chapters from the manga.	
5 January	Snow White with the Red Hair	1	Bones	Masahiro Ando	Bundled with volume 15 of the manga.	
9 January	Koyomimonogatari		Shaft	Akiyuki Shinbo; Tomoyuki Itamura	An original net animation that is released on an app for iOS and Android devices.	
26 January	The Testament of Sister New Devil	1	Production IMS	Hisashi Saitō	Bundled with volume 7 of the manga adaptation.	
27 January	My Wife is the Student Council President	1	Seven		Bundled with volume nine of the manga.	
29 January	One-Punch Man OVA #02	1	Madhouse	Shingo Natsume	Titled "The Pupil Who Is an Extremely Poor Talker", this OVA was included in the 2nd volume of the One-Punch Man home video release.	
29 January - spring	Queen's Blade: Grimoire	2	FORTES	Kinji Yoshimoto	Kuīnzu Bureido Gurimuwāru	
4 February	Noblesse: Awakening	1	Production I.G	Shunsuke Tada; Kazuto Nakazawa		
6 February	Code Geass: Akito the Exiled	1	Sunrise	Kazuki Akane	Episode 5 of Code Geass: Akito the Exiled. Titled "To the Beloved" (愛シキモノタチヘ, Itoshiki Mono-tachi e).	
24 February	One-Punch Man OVA #03	1	Madhouse		Titled "The Overly Complicated Ninja", this OVA was included in the 3rd volume of the One-Punch Man home video release.	
4 March	Prison School	1	J.C.Staff	Tsutomu Mizushima	An OAD adapting the "Mad Wax" arc, it was bundled with the limited edition of the manga's 20th volume.	
9 March	Sky Wizards Academy	1	Diomedéa	Takayuki Inagaki	An unaired "episode 13" of the TV series, the OVA was bundled with the ninth volume of the light novel series.	
18 March	Bakuon!!	1			Bundled with the seventh volume of the manga.	
25 March	One-Punch Man OVA #04	1	Madhouse		Titled "Overly Pushy Bang", this OVA was included in the 4th volume of the One-Punch Man home video release.	
25 March	Shōjo-tachi wa Kōya o Mezasu	1			Included with the release of the game.	
30 March - 30 September	Brotherhood: Final Fantasy XV	6	A-1 Pictures	Soichi Masui	An ONA released online; prequel to the video game Final Fantasy XV. The sixth episode will be exclusive to the Final Fantasy XV: Ultimate Collector's Edition package, which will release on 30 September 2016.	
30 March	Charlotte	1	P.A. Works		Released on the 7th Blu-ray/DVD volume along with episode 13 of the TV series.	
22 April	One-Punch Man OVA #05	1	Madhouse		Titled "Sisters in Various Places", this OVA was included in the 5th volume of the One-Punch Man home video release.	
6 May	Ajin: Demi-Human	1	Polygon Pictures	Hiroaki Ando	Bundled with the eighth volume of the manga.	
9 May	The Heroic Legend of Arslan	1	Liden Films		Bundled with the fifth limited edition of the manga.	
17 May	Fairy Tail	1	A-1 Pictures		Bundled with the 55th volume of the manga, the OVA adapts the "Fairy Penalty Game" one-shot manga.	
21 May - TBA	Mobile Suit Gundam: The Origin	2	Sunrise	Yoshikazu Yasuhiko; Takashi Imanishi	Part 3 of the OVA series, titled Dawn of Rebellion, premiered in Japanese theaters on 21 May. Part 4, titled Fateful Eve, will premiere in fall 2016.	
27 May	One-Punch Man OVA #06	1	Madhouse		Titled "The Murder Case that is Too Impossible", this OVA is included in the 6th volume of the One-Punch Man home video release.	
3 June	Blood Blockade Battlefront	1	Bones	Rie Matsumoto	Bundled with the official Blood Blockade Battlefront guidebook.	
6 June	Drifters	1	Hoods Drifters Studio		Bundled with the fifth volume of the manga.	
6 June	Hantsu × Trash	1	Hoods Entertainment		Bundled with the tenth volume of the manga.	
22 June	Kishibe Rohan wa Ugokanai	1	David Production		Bundled with the first volume of the JoJo's Bizarre Adventure: Diamond Is Unbreakable home video release.	
24 June - 24 August	Kuma Miko: Girl Meets Bear	2	Kinema Citrus; EMT Squared		Included in the first and second volumes of the Kuma Miko: Girl Meets Bear home video release.	
24 June - 22 July	Tanaka-kun is Always Listless	2	Silver Link		Included in the first and second volumes of the Tanaka-kun is Always Listless home video release.	
26 June	RS Project -Rebirth Storage-	1		Osamu Kamei	Also known as RS Keikaku -Rebirth Storage-, this is a TV special that aired on Fuji TV on 26 June 2016.	
29 June - 17 August	Sansha San'yō	3	Doga Kobo		Included in the first, second and third volumes of the Sansha San'yō home video release.	
4 July	Food Wars: Shokugeki no Soma	1	J.C. Staff		Bundled with the 19th volume of the manga.	
4 July - 2 December	To Love-Ru Darkness	2			Bundled with the sixteenth and seventeenth volumes of the manga, the OVA is meant to commemorate the series' 10th anniversary.	
7 July - TBA	Planetarian: The Reverie of a Little Planet	5	David Production	Naokatsu Tsuda	Also known as Planetarian: Chiisana Hoshi no Yume, this is an ONA adaptation of the Planetarian: The Reverie of a Little Planet visual novel developed by Key.	
15 July	Fairy Tail	1			Bundled with the 56th volume of the manga.	
27 July - 28 September	Joker Game	2	Production I.G		Titled "Kuroneko Yoru no Bōken", this is included in two Blu-ray sets of the Joker Game home video release.	
27 July - 21 September	Star-Myu	2	C-Station		Included in the two OVA volumes as part of an OVA project.	
28 July	My Teen Romantic Comedy SNAFU	1	Feel		Bundled with the limited edition of the My Teen Romantic Comedy SNAFU TOO! PS Vita game.	
1 August	Under the Dog	1	Kinema Citrus	Masahiro Andō	Available digitally to those who backed the Under the Dog Kickstarter campaign.	
4 August - 4 November	Gintama	2	Bandai Namco Pictures	Chizuru Miyawaki	Bundled with the 65th and 66th volumes of the manga.	
19 August - 20 December	Akatsuki no Yona: Yona of the Dawn	2	Studio Pierrot	Kazuhiro Yoneda	Bundled with the 21st and 22nd limited edition volumes of the manga.	
26 August	Dimension W	1	Orange; 3Hz		Bundled with the 6th volume of the Dimension W home video release.	
29 August	Paradise of Innocence	1	Seven	Takashi Nishikawa	Bundled with the 10th limited edition volume of the manga.	
3 September	Persona 5 the Animation -The Day Breakers-	1	A-1 Pictures	Takaharu Ozaki	A TV special that will air on Tokyo MX on 3 September.	
23 September	Nijiiro Days	1	Production Reed		Bundled with the 13th limited edition volume of the manga.	
5 October	Myriad Colors Phantom World	1	Kyoto Animation		Bundled with the seventh volume of the Myriad Colors Phantom World home video release.	
7 October	Ajin: Demi-Human	1	Polygon Pictures		Bundled with the ninth limited edition volume of the manga.	
12 November	Monster Musume	1	Lerche	Tatsuya Yoshihara	Bundled with the eleventh volume of the manga.	
17 November	Fairy Tail	1	A-1 Pictures		Bundled with the 58th volume of the manga.	
20 December	Bakuon!!	1	TMS/8PAN		Bundled with the 9th volume of the manga.	

== Highest-grossing films ==
The following are the 10 highest-grossing anime films of 2016.

Rank	Title	Gross	Ref.
1	Your Name	$358,331,458	
2	Detective Conan: The Darkest Nightmare	$66,265,957	
3	One Piece Film: Gold	$66,207,073	
4	Doraemon: Nobita and the Birth of Japan 2016	$50,541,040	
5	A Silent Voice	$31,629,474	
6	Crayon Shin-chan: Fast Asleep! Dreaming World Big Assault!	$20,816,508	
7	In This Corner of the World	$19,204,593	
8	Yo-kai Watch: Soratobu Kujira to Double no Sekai no Daibōken da Nyan!	$17,000,000	
9	Pokémon the Movie: Volcanion and the Mechanical Marvel	$15,870,009	
10	Rudolf the Black Cat	$12,001,747	

== See also ==
- 2016 in Japanese television (general)
- 2016 in Brazilian television
- 2016 in Polish television
- 2016 in Portuguese television
- 2016 in Spanish television
- 2016 in animation
- 2016 in television
