= Morita-san wa Mukuchi =

Japanese manga series

- First tankōbon volume cover, featuring Mayu Morita

森田さんは無口
- Genre: Comedy, slice of life
- Manga
- Written by: Tae Sano
- Published by: Takeshobo
- English publisher: JManga
- Magazine: Manga Life; Manga Life Momo; Manga Club
- Original run: March 2007 – present
- Volumes: 22
- Original video animation
- Directed by: Naotaka Hayashi
- Written by: Yū Satō
- Studio: Studio Gram
- Released: February 26, 2011
- Runtime: 24 minutes
- Original video animation
- Directed by: Naotaka Hayashi
- Written by: Yū Satō
- Studio: Studio Gram
- Released: March 25, 2011
- Anime television series
- Directed by: Naotaka Hayashi
- Written by: Ryou Karasuma
- Studio: Seven
- Original network: KBS Kyoto, TV Saitama
- Original run: July 6, 2011 – December 26, 2011
- Episodes: 26

Morita-san wa Mukuchi (森田さんは無口; "Morita-san is Taciturn") is a Japanese four-panel comic strip manga written and illustrated by Tae Sano. The manga was originally published in the March 2007 issue of Takeshobo's Manga Life magazine, and later moved to Takeshobo's Manga Life Momo and Manga Club magazines. The first tankōbon volume was released in January 2009; as of November 2022, twenty-one volumes have been published. An original video animation by Studio Gram was bundled with volume three of the manga in February 2011, with an extended version released separately in March 2011. An anime television series, instead animated by Seven, aired in Japan on KBS Kyoto between July and December 2011.

== Characters ==
Mayu Morita (森田 真由, Morita Mayu)
Voiced by: Kana Hanazawa
The protagonist of the series. She is often silent as she spends too much time thinking about what to say. She often tries to follow advice given to her by her mother, though this is often misinterpreted by her classmates.
Miki Murakoshi (村越 美樹, Murakoshi Miki)
Voiced by: Haruka Tomatsu
Mayu's best friend who is really chatty. She often gets lots of crushes on boys but usually ends up alone.
Chihiro Miura (三浦 千尋, Miura Chihiro)
Voiced by: Saori Hayami
Another of Mayu's friends who enjoys sweets. She has a crush on Ritsuki.
Hana Matsuzaka (松坂 花, Matsuzaka Hana)
Voiced by: Yoshino Nanjō
A shy young girl. Though she wishes to make friends with Morita she often cannot due to the way Morita-san stares which she describes as "soulless", and the aura Morita gives while concentrating. She has very curly blonde hair which she is self conscious over, on various occasions apologizing to Morita-san whom often gets her fingers tangled in Hana's hair. Her mother and grandmother don't get along very well.
Ritsuki Yamamoto (山本 りつき, Yamamoto Ritsuki)
Voiced by: Mie Hiraga
A tall long haired girl who is popular amongst the girls, often receiving many confessions. Despite her calm nature, she sometimes mispronounces her wording when under pressure, leading to some huge misunderstandings.
Girl with Glasses (メガネ娘, Megane Musume)
Voiced by: Maki Tsuchiya (OVA), Amina Satō (TV)
A rather unknown character which on various occasions appears hiding around corners. She appears to have some sort of interest in Morita-san and has a habit on constantly trying to surprise her which often ends badly.
Yumi Morita (森田 由美, Morita Yumi)
Voiced by: Ami Nanase
Mayu's mother, who was the one who gave her advice on manners, although the context in which these lessons were given generally involved confronting her husband about flirting with other women.
Mayu's Father (真由の父, Morita no Chichi)
Voiced by: Masatori Ki
Mayu's father, who often finds himself on the receiving end of Yumi's anger due to his constant nights out.
Kōichi Ōno (大野 浩一, Ōno Kōichi) and Ryūta Kokubo (小久保 隆太, Kokubo Ryūta)
Voiced by: Kouta Oshita and Ryuichi Kubota
A pair of boys in Mayu's class who often view her interactions with her friends as some kind of yuri scenario.
Yukino Morita (森田 雪乃, Morita Yukino)
Mayu's cousin who is a bit shameless around her.

== Media ==
=== Manga ===
Morita-san wa Mukuchi began as a four-panel comic strip manga written and illustrated by Tae Sano. The manga originally appeared in the March 2007 issue of Takeshobo's Manga Life magazine. Guest publications also appeared in the July 2007 issue of Takeshobo's Manga Life Momo magazine, the November 2007 issue of Manga Life, and the December 2007 issue of Takeshobo's Manga Club magazine. The manga began regular serialization from the October 2007 issue of Manga Life Momo, though again appeared as a guest publication in the January 2009 issue of Manga Life. A concurrent serialization of the manga began in the March 2009 issue of Manga Club. The first tankōbon volume was published by Takeshobo on December 27, 2008; as of November 16, 2022, twenty-one volumes have been released. The series has been released in English on the JManga reader site.

==== Volumes ====
  1. First published on January 10, 2009 (Released on December 27, 2008)）、ISBN 978-4-8124-7021-3 - Includes a newly drawn afterword
  2. First published on July 10, 2010 (released June 26, 2010)）、ISBN 978-4-8124-7296-5
  3. First published on March 12, 2011 (released on February 26, 2011)）、ISBN 978-4-8124-7514-0
    - Special Edition、ISBN 978-4-8124-7483-9 - The package includes a short anime DVD and a booklet promoting the OVA.。
  4. First published on July 11, 2011 (released June 27, 2011)）、ISBN 978-4-8124-7602-4
  5. First published on February 10, 2012 (released on January 27, 2012)）、ISBN 978-4-8124-7732-8
    - Volume 5 Special Edition、ISBN 978-4-8124-7666-6 - An anime DVD is included as an appendix.
  6. First published on December 11, 2012 (released on November 27, 2012)）、ISBN 978-4-8124-8045-8
  7. First published on September 10, 2013 (released on August 27, 2013)）、ISBN 978-4-8124-8393-0
  8. First published on June 10, 2014 (Released on May 27, 2014)）、ISBN 978-4-8124-8590-3
  9. First published on January 10, 2015 (released on December 27, 2014)）、ISBN 978-4-8019-5069-6
  10. First published on August 10, 2015 (released on July 27, 2015)）、ISBN 978-4-8019-5313-0
  11. First published on May 11, 2016 (released on April 27, 2016)）、ISBN 978-4-8019-5511-0
  12. First published on February 10, 2017 (released on January 27, 2017)）、ISBN 978-4-8019-5732-9
  13. Released on June 27, 2017、ISBN 978-4-8019-5972-9
  14. Released on December 27, 2017、ISBN 978-4-8019-6146-3
  15. Released on June 27, 2018、ISBN 978-4-8019-6294-1
  16. First published on January 10, 2019 (released on December 27, 2018)）、ISBN 978-4-8019-6481-5
  17. Released on June 27, 2019、ISBN 978-4-8019-6660-4
  18. Released on December 17, 2019、ISBN 978-4-8019-6829-5
  19. Released on February 27, 2021、ISBN 978-4-8019-7215-5
  20. Released on November 26, 2021、ISBN 978-4-8019-7493-7
  21. Released on November 16, 2022、ISBN 978-4-8019-7902-4
  22. Released on September 14, 2023、ISBN 978-4-8019-8151-5
- Tae Sano "Morita-san is Silent S" Takeshobo "Bamboo Comics", released on September 30, 2017、ISBN 978-4-8019-6061-9

=== Anime ===
An original video animation DVD produced by Studio Gram was bundled with the limited edition of the third manga volume sold on February 26, 2011. An extended version was released by itself on March 25, 2011. The second OVA features two pieces of theme music: one opening theme and one ending theme. The opening theme is "Morita-san wa Mukuchi" (森田さんは無口) sung by Kana Hanazawa and Haruka Tomatsu, and the ending theme is "Tōmawarishite Kaero!" (遠回りして帰ろ!, "We'll Take the Detour Home!") sung by Yoshino Nanjō and Saori Hayami. A single containing the theme songs was released on March 25, 2011.

An anime television series, animated by Seven, aired in Japan between July 6 and December 26, 2011, and was also simulcast by Crunchyroll. Two bonus episodes were released with the fifth volume of the manga in January 2012. For episodes 1–13, the opening theme is "Motto Aishiaimasho" (もっと愛しあいましょ, I Want More Love) by Iori Nomizu. For episodes 14 onwards, the opening theme is "Nya Nya Kibun" (にゃあにゃあ気分, Meow Meow Feeling) by Fuwawaka.

| No. | Title | Original release date |
|---|---|---|
| 1 | "Morita-san is Taciturn" "Morita-san wa Mukuchi" (森田さんは無口) | July 6, 2011 |
Mayu Morita has trouble making friends due to her ever silent nature.
| 2 | "Miki is Chatty" "Miki wa Oshaberi" (美樹はおしゃべり) | July 13, 2011 |
Mayu puts up with the chatty conversation of her best friend, Miki Murakoshi.
| 3 | "Hana-chan is Really Shy" "Hana-chan wa Hitomishiri" (花ちゃんは人見知り) | July 20, 2011 |
The shy Hana Matsuzaka gets to talk with Mayu after she spots something in her hair.
| 4 | "Summer is Naturally Hot" "Natsu wa Atsukute Atarimae" (夏は暑くて当たり前) | July 27, 2011 |
Mayu and her friends try to beat off the summer heat.
| 5 | "High School Girls Like Sweets" "Joshikō-sei wa Amai Mono-zuki" (女子高生は甘いモノ好き) | August 3, 2011 |
Mayu and friends go to an ice cream shop, where they discover a delicious looking parfait.
| 6 | "Their Delusions are Unstoppable" "Mōsō wa Tomaranai" (妄想は止まらない) | August 10, 2011 |
A pair of boys, along with a girl with glasses, make delusional observations of Mayu and friends
| 7 | "There Are Many Ideal Types" "Risō wa Iroiro" (理想はいろいろ) | August 17, 2011 |
The girls talk about what their ideal partner would be like whilst Miki's ideal crush gets shot down.
| 8 | "Yukata are Seasonal" "Yukata wa Fūbutsushi" (浴衣は風物詩) | August 24, 2011 |
Mayu and friends go to a summer festival together.
| 9 | "The Pool is Full of Charm" "Pūru wa Miryoku-teki" (プールは魅力的) | August 31, 2011 |
The girls have swimming classes.
| 10 | "Yamamoto-san is Cool" "Yamamoto-san wa Kūru" (山本さんはクール) | September 7, 2011 |
Mayu encounters the popular Ritsuki Yamamoto, who ends up saying weird things when under pressure.
| 11 | "Doing Things For Yourself" "Tamani wa Hitori de" (たまには一人で) | September 14, 2011 |
After a test, Mayu goes by herself to a cake shop.
| 12 | "The Two are Lovey Dovey" "Futari wa Atsuatsu" (ふたりはアツアツ) | September 21, 2011 |
Mayu worries about the relationship between her parents.
| 13 | "Everybody's Day Off" "Kyūjitsu wa Minna de" (休日はみんなで) | September 28, 2011 |
Mayu and her friends go shopping where they try to find matching items.
| 14 | "Ms. Maki is in Charge" "Tannin wa Maki-sensei" (担任は牧先生) | October 5, 2011 |
Mayu and Yamamoto help out their teacher, Ms. Maki.
| 15 | "Baking is a Fierce Battle" "Okashi Tsukuri wa Shinken Shōbu" (お菓子作りは真剣勝負) | October 12, 2011 |
Hana shows a different side to herself when it comes to baking.
| 16 | "Autumn is the Season for Reading" "Aki wa Dokusho no Kisetsu" (秋は読書の季節) | October 19, 2011 |
Mayu and the girls check out the school library.
| 17 | "Changing Seats is Lucky" "Sekikae wa Unshidai" (席替えは運次第) | October 25, 2011 |
Mayu's class changes their seating arrangement.
| 18 | "Sleepovers are Fun" "Otomari wa Tanoshii" (お泊りは楽しい) | November 1, 2011 |
The girls have a sleepover at Mayu's house.
| 19 | "Autumn is the Season of Love?" "Aki wa Koi no Kisetsu?" (秋は恋の季節?) | November 8, 2011 |
Mayu stumbles upon Yamamoto receiving a confession from another girl whom she turns down.
| 20 | "Ms. Hama is Anxious" "Hama-sensei wa Shinpaisei" (浜先生は心配性) | November 15, 2011 |
The class is introduced to a nervous trainee teacher named Ms. Hama who seems to misread Mayu's good will.
| 21 | "Cultural Festivals Require Important Preparations" "Bunkosai wa Junbi ga Inochi" (文化祭は準備が命) | November 22, 2011 |
Mayu's class prepares a flea market for the school's cultural festival.
| 22 | "Staying Home with a Cold" "Kaze no Nichi wa Oiede" (風邪の日はお家で) | November 29, 2011 |
Mayu catches a cold and spends the day at home.
| 23 | "It is Amiable to be Careless" "Sosokkashiino wa Goaikyō" (そそっかしいのはご愛嬌) | December 6, 2011 |
Mayu and the others become worried when Miki is late for class due to 'hitting a car'.
| 24 | "Mayu is Never Angry?" "Mayu wa Ikaranai?" (真由は怒らない?) | December 13, 2011 |
Miki recalls of a time when Mayu was once angry at someone.
| 25 | "Everyone gets Part Time Jobs at Christmas" "Kurisumasu wa Minna de Baito" (クリスマスはみんなでバイト) | December 20, 2011 |
Mayu and friends get a part time job selling cakes on Christmas Eve
| 26 | "Those Four are Pretty Close" "Yonin wa Nakayoshi" (四人は仲良し) | December 26, 2011 |
Mayu becomes worried when Miki and Chihiro have a fight, though they soon make up.
| Bonus–1 | "The Meeting At That Time" "Deai wa Anotoki" (出会いはあの時) | January 27, 2012 |
Chihiro recalls when she first became friends with Mayu and Miki.
| Bonus–2 | "Exams are Tough" "Juken wa Taihen" (受験は大変) | January 27, 2012 |
Mayu and Miki recall when they took their exams to get into high school and were greeted by many bad omens.
