= Yoshino Nanjō =

Japanese voice actress and singer (born 1984)

- 南條 愛乃
- Born: July 12, 1984 (age 42); Shizuoka Prefecture, Japan
- Occupations: Voice actress; singer
- Years active: 2006–present
- Agent: Voice Kit
- Notable credits: Love Live! as Eli Ayase; Robotics;Notes as Akiho Senomiya; Tantei Opera Milky Holmes as Kokoro Akechi; Clockwork Planet as Naoto Miura; Symphogear as Shirabe Tsukuyomi; You and Idol Precure as Purirun/Purin Tanaka/Cure Zukyoon
- Height: 150 cm (4 ft 11 in)
- Musical career
- Genres: J-pop, Anison
- Instrument: Vocals
- Years active: 2009–present
- Labels: NBCUniversal Entertainment Japan; Republic Records (2025–present)
- Formerly of: fripSide
- Website: nbcuni-music.com/yoshino_nanjo/

Yoshino Nanjō (南條 愛乃, Nanjō Yoshino; born July 12, 1984) is a Japanese voice actress and singer. She is affiliated with Voice Kit. Among her most popular roles is Eli Ayase from Love Live! School Idol Project series. She became the lead singer of the Japanese pop and trance duo fripSide in 2009 until she announced in October 2021 her retirement from the music duo. Her nickname is Nanjolno.

== Biography ==
Yoshino Nanjō was raised in Shimizu, a ward in the city of Shizuoka. Nanjō's music career began in 2009 when she replaced the singer Nao as the lead singer of the band fripSide. Her first song as a member of the band was "Only My Railgun", which was used as the opening theme to the anime television series A Certain Scientific Railgun. In 2010, she was cast in the Love Live! franchise as Eli Ayase, a member of the fictional idol group μ's, as well as a member of its sub-unit BiBi. She released her first mini-album "Katarumoa" on December 12, 2012. She released her first solo single "Kimi ga Emu Yūgure" (君が笑む夕暮れ) on November 27, 2013; the title song is used as the first ending theme to the 2013 anime television series Tokyo Ravens. In 2015, she together with the other voice actresses of Love Live!, received the Best Singing Award at the 9th Seiyu Awards for best musical performance group. Meanwhile, at the 13th Seiyu Awards, Nanjo won the Influencer Award, she was the first recipient of the award as it was introduced in that year. She released a new album titled N no Hako (Nのハコ) on July 25, 2016. She released a new album titled THE MEMORIES APARTMENT -Anime- which featured all of her singles to date and six covers and also THE MEMORIES APARTMENT -Original- in which fans voted for their favourite song of Nanjo's from her entire discography (singles and covers excluded) simultaneously on July 18, 2018.

On October 31, 2021, Nanjō announced she was departing as fripSide's vocalist following their two-day concert at the Saitama Super Arena on April 23 and 24, 2022. She joined Republic Records on November 28, 2025.

== Discography ==
=== Singles ===
Year	Album name	Peak Oricon Chart Position
2013	Kimi ga Emu Yuugure (君が笑む夕暮れ)	33
2014	Anata no Aishita Sekai (あなたの愛した世界)	17
2015	Tasogare no Starlight (黄昏のスタアライト)	18
2015	Kimi o Sagashi ni (君を探しに)	14
2016	Zero Ichi Kiseki (ゼロイチキセキ)	10
2017	Hikari no Hajimari (光のはじまり)	8
2017	Issai wa Monogatari (一切は物語) (feat. Nagi Yanagi)	7
2019	Kimi no Tonari Watashi no Basho (君のとなりわたしの場所)	13
2019	Sayounara no Wakusei (サヨウナラの惑星)	14
2020	Yabu no Naka no Synthesis (藪の中のジンテーゼ)	10
2020	Namida Nagaruru Mama (涙流るるまま)	23
2021	EVOLUTiON:	20
2022	Hitori to Kimi to (ヒトリとキミと)	24
2023	Sen (閃-Sen-)	22

=== Albums ===
==== Studio albums ====
Year	Album name	Peak Oricon chart position
2015	Tokyo 1/3650 (東京1/3650)	5
2016	N no Hako (Nのハコ)	4
2017	San Trois (サントロワ∴)	6
2021	A Tiny Winter Story	20
2022	Journey's Trunk	30
2023	The Fantasic Garden	17

==== Mini albums ====
Year	Album name	Peak Oricon Chart Position
2012	Katarumoa (カタルモア)	83
2019	LIVE A LIFE	9

==== Best albums ====
Year	Album name	Peak Oricon Chart Position
2018	Nanjo Yoshino Best Album: THE MEMORIES APARTMENT – Original –	11
2018	Nanjo Yoshino Best Album: THE MEMORIES APARTMENT – Anime –	12

==== Acoustic albums ====
Year	Album name	Peak
2020	Acoustic for you.	8

== Filmography ==
=== Anime ===
2006

- Soul Link as Aya Sugimoto
- Tsuyokiss Cool×Sweet as Honoka Konoe
- Hanoka as Mika Kisaragi

2007

- Da Capo II as Koko Tsukishima

2008

- Da Capo II Second Season as Koko Tsukishima

2009

- Weiß Survive as Cal
- CANAAN as Maria Oosawa
- Modern Magic Made Simple as Student (ep 2)
- A Certain Scientific Railgun as Maaya Awatsuki
- Weiß Survive R as Cal
- Katekyo Hitman Reborn! as Yuni

2010

- Baka to Test to Shokanju as Aiko Kudō
- Tantei Opera Milky Holmes as Kokoro Akechi

2011

- Cardfight!! Vanguard as Rekka Tatsunagi
- Hourou Musuko as Kanako Sasa
- Hanasaku Iroha as Namiko Igarashi
- Hoshizora e Kakaru Hashi as Young Hajime Nakatsugawa
- The Qwaser of Stigmata II as Tsubasa Amano
- Morita-san wa Mukuchi as Hana Matsuzaka
- Baka to Test to Shokanju Ni as Aiko Kudō
- Nekogami Yaoyorozu as Haruka, Kyōko Daimonji
- Maken-ki! as Otohime Yamato

2012

- Recorder and Randsell as Tetsuya
- Tantei Opera Milky Holmes Dai-Ni-Maku as Kokoro Akechi
- Bodacious Space Pirates as Yayoi Yoshitomi
- Another as Sayuri Kakinuma
- Recorder and Randsell Re as Tetsuya
- Shirokuma Cafe as Nursery School Teacher (ep 17)
- Cardfight!! Vanguard: Asia Circuit Hen as Rekka Tatsunagi
- Tari Tari as Akiko Okuto
- Upotte!! as 88(SR-88A)
- Joshiraku as Gankyō Kūrubiyūtei
- Robotics;Notes as Akiho Senomiya

2013

- D.C.III: Da Capo III as Edward Watson
- Cardfight!! Vanguard: Link Joker Hen as Rekka Tatsunagi
- Minami-ke Tadaima as Miyuki
- Love Live! as Eli Ayase
- A Certain Scientific Railgun S as Maaya Awatsuki
- Recorder and Randsell Mi as Tetsuya
- Senki Zesshō Symphogear G as Shirabe Tsukuyomi
- Futari wa Milky Holmes as Kokoro Akechi

2014

- The Pilot's Love Song as Nanako Hanasaki
- Cardfight!! Vanguard: Legion Mate Hen as Rekka Tatsunagi
- Riddle Story of Devil as Nio Hashiri
- Love Live! Season 2 as Eli Ayase
- Magica Wars as Matsuri Sengen
- PriPara as Nao Ehime, Nanami Shiroi, Nene Tokuda

2015

- Classroom Crisis as Subaru Yamaki
- Senki Zesshō Symphogear GX as Shirabe Tsukuyomi
- Tantei Kageki Milky Holmes TD as Kokoro Akechi
- Panpaka Pants as Panpaka

2016

- And you thought there is never a girl online? as Yui Saitō/Nekohime
- Schwarzesmarken as Lise Hohenstein
- Tama and Friends as Momo
- Quiz Tokiko-san as Tokiko

2017

- Clockwork Planet as Naoto Miura
- Battle Girl High School as Renge Serizawa
- Atom: The Beginning as Maria
- Senki Zesshō Symphogear AXZ as Shirabe Tsukuyomi
- Berserk as Sonia
- Neko no Robu as Robu
- Makeruna!! Aku no Gundan! as Narrator (Episode 8)

2018

- Dances with the Dragons as Curaso Opt Koga
- Killing Bites as Seira Son
- Rilu Rilu Fairilu as Gardenia
- Hakyuu Houshin Engi as Ko Kibi
- Isekai Izakaya "Nobu" as Hildegard
- Karakuri Circus as Liang Ming-Xia

2019

- My Roommate Is a Cat as Haru Akimoto
- King of Prism: Shiny Seven Stars as Tsubasa Takahashi
- Senki Zesshō Symphogear XV as Shirabe Tsukuyomi

2020

- Yatogame-chan Kansatsu Nikki 2 Satsume as Lala Shonai
- Hatena Illusion as Maeve Hoshisato
- A Certain Scientific Railgun T as Maaya Awatsuki
- Lapis Re:Lights as Chloe
- King's Raid: Successors of the Will as Lupine

2021

- Yatogame-chan Kansatsu Nikki 3 Satsume as Lala Shonai
- The Fruit of Evolution as Karen Kannazuki

2022

- Yatogame-chan Kansatsu Nikki 4 Satsume as Lala Shonai
- Hanabi-chan Is Often Late as Condor Tsubasa Isogami

2023

- A Herbivorous Dragon of 5,000 Years Gets Unfairly Villainized as Ryatt (Japanese dub)
- Don't Toy with Me, Miss Nagatoro 2nd Attack as Nagatoro's sister
- The Aristocrat's Otherworldly Adventure: Serving Gods Who Go Too Far as Cain
- My Daughter Left the Nest and Returned an S-Rank Adventurer as Rosetta

2024

- Bartender: Glass of God as Miwa Kurushima
- Mission: Yozakura Family as Rinne Kitasato

2025

- I Left My A-Rank Party to Help My Former Students Reach the Dungeon Depths! as Camila
- You and Idol Precure as Purirun/Purin Tanaka/Cure Zukyoon
- Princession Orchestra as Yōko Sorano

2026

- Mistress Kanan Is Devilishly Easy as Lilim Zebul
- Magical Girl Raising Project: Restart as Pfle

=== Animated films ===
2013

- A Certain Magical Index: The Movie – The Miracle of Endymion as Maaya Awatsuki

2014

- Cardfight!! Vanguard: The Movie as Rekka Tatsunagi
- Panpaka Pants The Movie: Treasure of the Bananan Kingdom as Panpaka

2015

- Love Live! The School Idol Movie as Eli Ayase

2016

- PriPara Minna no Akogare Let's Go PriPari as Nao Ehime, Nanami Shirai
- Tantei Opera Milky Holmes the Movie: Milky Holmes' Counterattack as Kokoro Akechi

2017

- Trinity Seven the Movie: The Eternal Library and the Alchemist Girl as Master Akarsha
- PriPara: Mi~nna de Kagayake! Kirarin Star Live as Nao Ehime

2019

- Grisaia: Phantom Trigger the Animation as Maki
- King of Prism: Shiny Seven Stars as Tsubasa Takahashi

=== OVA/ONA ===
- Ah! My Goddess: Itsumo Futari De as Eiru, Saaga
- Baby Princess 3D Paradise 0 [Love] as Sakura
- Morita-san wa Mukuchi as Hana Matsuzaka
- Penguin Girl as Nene Kurio
- A Certain Scientific Railgun as Maaya Awatsuki
- Love Live! School Idol Project OVA as Eli Ayase
- Pole Princess!! as Yukari Mikoshiro

=== Video games ===
2006

- Ar tonelico: Melody of Elemia as Krusche Elendia, Tastiella de Lu
- Soul Link EXTENSION as Aya Sugimoto

2007

- The Bincho-tan Shiawase-goyomi as Additional Voice

2009

- Little Anchor as Chloe Anderson
- Canvas 3: Tanshoku no Pastel as Renka Yamabuki

2010

- Ar tonelico Qoga: Knell of Ar Ciel as Krusche Elendia
- fortissimo//Akkord:Bsusvier as Sakura
- Tales of Graces f as Little Queen
- Tantei Opera Milky Holmes as Kokoro Akechi

2011

- Otome wa Boku ni Koishiteru ~ Futari no Elder as Awayuki Reizei

2012

- Soulcalibur V as Leixia
- Da Capo III as Koko Tsukishima
- Robotics;Notes as Akiho Senomiya

2013

- The Guided Fate Paradox as Lanael Shiratori (Credited as "Eli Ayase")
- Love Live! School Idol Festival – Eli Ayase

2014

- Aiyoku no Eustia as Eustia Astraea
- Hyperdevotion Noire: Goddess Black Heart as Ryūka
- Love Live! School Idol Paradise as Eli Ayase
- Magica Wars as Matsuri Sengen

2015

- Battle Girl High School as Renge Serizawa
- Tokyo Mirage Sessions ♯FE – Kiria Kurono
- Final Fantasy XIV: Heavensward – Krile Maya Baldesion
- Stella Glow – Lisette
- Dream Girlfriend

2017

- Final Fantasy XIV: Stormblood – Krile Maya Baldesion, Suzaku
- Senki Zesshou Symphogear XD Unlimited – Shirabe Tsukuyomi

2018

- Magia Record – Suzune Amano
- Final Fantasy Brave Exvius – Citra
- Higurashi When They Cry Hō – Tamura Hime no Mikoto

2019

- Robotics;Notes DaSH – Akiho Senomiya
- Valiant Force – Theia Alexander
- Final Fantasy XIV: Shadowbringers – Krile Maya Baldesion, Lyna
- Granblue Fantasy – Eli Ayase, Tikoh
- Love Live! School Idol Festival All Stars – Eli Ayase

2020

- Tokyo Mirage Sessions#FE ENCORE – Kiria Kurono
- Trials of Mana – Isabella / Belladonna
- Fire Emblem Heroes – Kiria Kurono
- Onmyouji – Kinnara
- Higurashi When They Cry Mei – Tamura Hime no Mikoto
- Lord of Heroes – Lyn

2021

- Final Fantasy XIV: Endwalker – Krile Maya Baldesion

2022

- The Tale of Onogoro – Haru Kose
- Alchemy Stars – Sanae
- Tower of Fantasy – Lin

2023

- Honkai: Star Rail – Topaz

2024

- Final Fantasy XIV: Dawntrail – Krile Maya Baldesion
- Arknights – Shu
- Metaphor: ReFantazio – Junah

2025

- Zenless Zone Zero – Trigger

=== Live-action Film ===
- Brave Father Online: Our Story of Final Fantasy XIV (2019)

=== Dubbing roles ===
==== Live-action ====
- East of Eden – Lee Ki-soon (Jeon So-min)
- Roman Holiday (New Era Movies Edition) – Princess Ann (Audrey Hepburn)

==== Animation ====
- The Grinch – Blonde Who
- The Secret Life of Pets 2 – Princess
