= Magical Somera-chan =

Japanese manga and anime series

- Cover of Magical Somera-chan volume one.

不思議なソメラちゃん (Fushigi na Somera-chan)
- Genre: Comedy
- Manga
- Written by: Choborau Nyopomi
- Published by: Ichijinsha
- Magazine: Manga Palette Lite
- Original run: 2009 – April 2011
- Volumes: 2
- Manga

Fushigi na Somera-chan Haute Couture
- Written by: Choborau Nyopomi
- Published by: Ichijinsha
- Magazine: Manga 4-koma Palette
- Original run: 22 April 2015 – 22 May 2018
- Volumes: 7
- Anime television series
- Directed by: Itsuki Imazaki
- Written by: Itsuki Imazaki
- Music by: Fūga Hatori
- Studio: Seven
- Original network: AT-X, TV Saitama, KBS, TVK, Sun TV
- Original run: 7 October 2015 – 23 December 2015
- Episodes: 12

Magical Somera-chan (不思議なソメラちゃん, Fushigi na Somera-chan; "Mysterious Somera-chan") is a Japanese four-panel manga series written and illustrated by Choborau Nyopomi (ちょぼらうにょぽみ, Choboraunyopomi), author of Ai Mai Mi. It ran in Ichijinsha's Manga Palette Lite magazine until the magazine was cancelled in 2011, and was relaunched as Fushigi na Somera-chan Haute Couture (不思議なソメラちゃんオートクチュール, Fushigi na Somera-chan Ōtokuchūru) in Manga 4-koma Palette in 2015, where it ran until 2018. An anime television series adaptation began airing in October 2015.

== Characters ==
Somera Nonomoto
Voiced by: Sayaka Nakaya
Somera Nonomoto (野々本ソメラ, Nonomoto Somera) or Somera-chan is a girl who can wield the mysterious and invincible "Nonomoto Mahou-ken" form of magical kenpō, which she inherited from her late mother.
Kukuru Nonomoto
Voiced by: Kaede Hondo
Kukuru Nonomoto (野々本ククル, Nonomoto Kukuru) is Somera-chan's younger sister.
Shizuku Tendō
Voiced by: Rika Momokawa
Shizuku Tendō (天童 雫, Tendō Shigeku) is Somera-chan's friend and neighbor.
Ai Matsushima
Voiced by: Maria Naganawa
Ai Matsushima (松嶋あい, Matsushima Ai) is a girl who is looking for her missing sister.

== Media ==
=== Manga ===
Choborau Nyopomi published the Fushigi na Somera-chan manga in Ichijinsha's Manga Palette Lite magazine beginning in its 6th issue and ending in its 38th issue in April 2011, when the magazine ceased publication. The series was compiled into two tankōbon volumes, both of which are out of print and only available on Amazon Kindle.

A sequel, titled Fushigi na Somera-chan Haute Couture, began publication in the June issue of Ichijinsha's Manga 4-koma Palette on 22 April 2015 after the announcement of the anime television prompted a number of readers to request the return of the series. The series ended on 22 May 2018.

==== Volume list ====
No.	Japanese release date	Japanese ISBN
1	22 July 2010	978-4-75-808093-4
2	22 June 2011	978-4-75-808126-9

Fushigi na Somera-chan Haute Couture

No.	Japanese release date	Japanese ISBN
1	22 December 2015	978-4758082556
2	22 February 2017	978-4758082815

=== Anime ===
An anime adaptation, directed by Itsuki Imazaki, was originally teased as an April Fools' Day joke, but Imazaki later confirmed that production had begun and he was working on storyboards for the series. It was later revealed that the anime, a television series, would be animated by animation studio Seven and produced by Dream Creation. Imazaki was also confirmed to be writing, producing, and creating character designs for the series. Masakatsu Oomuro serves as the show's sound director, and Fūga Hatori produces the music. Sound production for the series is provided by DAX Production. The anime adapted material both from the original manga and the sequel.

The anime is the third installment in the "Choborau Nyopomi Theater", after the Ai Mai Mi and Choboraunyopomi Gekijō Dainimaku Ai Mai Mi: Mōsō Catastrophe television series, both of which were also directed by Imazaki.

The series began airing on 7 October 2015 on AT-X, TV Saitama, KBS, TVK, and Sun TV. It is streamed worldwide by Crunchyroll.

==== Episode list ====
No.	Title	Original release date
1	"Here We Go! Say Hello to the Nonomoto Magic Fist" "Hajimatteru yo! Kore ga Nono hon Mahō ken!" (始まってるよ！これが野乃本魔法拳！)	7 October 2015
2	"Here We Go! New Character Auditions" "Hajimatteru yo! Daiichikai Shin Kyaraōdishon!" (始まってるよ！第一回新キャラオーディション！)	14 October 2015
3	"Here We Go! An Alien Invader!" "Hajimatteru yo! Uchū kara no Shinryaku-sha!!" (始まってるよ！宇宙からの侵略者!!)	21 October 2015
4	"Here We Go! Matsushima the Popular" "Hajimatteru yo! Matsushima Daininki!!" (始まってるよ！松嶋大人気!!)	28 October 2015
5	"Here We Go! Dr. Wommy's Human Catastrophe Project" "Hajimatteru yo! Dr Uomī no Jinrui Senmetsu Keikaku!!" (始まってるよ！Dr.ウォミーの人類殲滅計画!!)	5 November 2015
6	"Here We Go! Kukuru and the Female Pakkun" "Hajimatteru yo! Kukuru to Mesu Pakkun!!" (始まってるよ！ククルとメスぱっくん!!)	12 November 2015
7	"Here We Go! Somera vs. Matsushima" "Hajimetteru yo! Somera VS Matsushima!!" (始まってるよ！ソメラVS松嶋!!)	19 November 2015
8	"Here We Go! Domunperg the Creator" "Hajimatteru yo! Sōzōshin Domunperugu!!" (始まってるよ！創造神ドムンペルグ!!)	26 November 2015
9	"Here We Go! Goodbye Matsushima" "Hajimatteru yo! Matsushima to Sayōnara Kumikae!!" (始まってるよ！松嶋とさようなら組み換え!!)	3 December 2015
10	"Here We Go! Christmas Invader" "Hajimatteru yo! Kurisumasu no Shinnyū-sha!!" (始まってるよ！クリスマスの侵入者!!)	10 December 2015
11	"Here We Go! Human Massacre Project" "Hajimatteru yo! Zen Jinrui Massatsu Sakusen!!" (始まってるよ！全人類抹殺作戦!!)	17 December 2015
12	"Here We Go! Final Episode" "Hajimatteru yo! Somera-chan Saishūkai!!" (始まってるよ！ソメラちゃん最終回!!)	24 December 2015
