= Recorder and Randsell =

Japanese manga series by Meme Higashiya

- Cover of the first manga volume

リコーダーとランドセル (Rikōdā to Randoseru)
- Genre: Comedy, slice of life
- Manga
- Written by: Meme Higashiya
- Published by: Takeshobo
- English publisher: JManga
- Magazine: Manga Club Original; Manga Life Original
- Original run: 2007 – present
- Volumes: 19
- Anime television series

Recorder to Randoseru Do♪
- Directed by: Hiroshi Kimura
- Written by: Ryou Karasuma
- Music by: Takaaki Anzai
- Studio: Seven
- Original network: TV Saitama
- Original run: January 5, 2012 – March 28, 2012
- Episodes: 13
- Anime television series

Recorder to Randoseru Re♪
- Directed by: Hiroshi Kimura
- Written by: Ryou Karasuma
- Music by: Takaaki Anzai
- Studio: Seven
- Original network: TV Saitama
- Original run: April 4, 2012 – June 27, 2012
- Episodes: 13
- Anime television series

Recorder to Randoseru Mi♪
- Directed by: Itsuki Imazaki
- Written by: Itsuki Imazaki
- Music by: Takaaki Anzai
- Studio: Seven
- Licensed by: NA: Crunchyroll
- Original network: TV Saitama
- Original run: July 8, 2013 – September 23, 2013
- Episodes: 12
- icon

Recorder and Randsell (リコーダーとランドセル, Rikōdā to Randoseru; lit. Recorder and Backpack, also known as RecoRan) is a Japanese manga series by Meme Higashiya. It follows the lives of two siblings: Atsushi, a randoseru-wearing grade-schooler with the appearance of an adult, and his elder sister Atsumi, a high school girl with the appearance of a middle-schooler. An anime adaptation by Seven aired from January to June 2012, with another season airing in July 2013.

== Characters ==
Atsushi Miyagawa (宮川 あつし, Miyagawa Atsushi)
Voiced by: Ryōtarō Okiayu
A fifth grade elementary school boy who has the appearance of a fully grown adult but still acts his age. His appearance often gets him into trouble with the police, particularly when he hangs around his classmate Hina, who he has a crush on and is going out with.
Atsumi Miyagawa (宮川 あつみ, Miyagawa Atsumi)
Voiced by: Rie Kugimiya
Atsushi's older sister who is in high school, but is short and has the appearance of a young girl. She is very responsible, but is quite reliant on Atsushi's height.
Sayo Takahashi (高橋沙夜, Takahashi Sayo)
Voiced by: Aya Hirano
Atsumi's classmate and friend, who develops a crush on Atsushi despite later discovering that he is actually a grade schooler. She could see Hina as a future rival for Atsushi.
Futami Moriyama (盛山 ふたみ, Moriyama Futami)
Voiced by: Tomoe Tamiyasu
Atsushi's elementary school teacher. Having previously taught at an all-girls school, she is not good with dealing with men, particularly Atsushi. Despite this, she has been shown to retrieve him from the police when he gets taken in.
Hina Soejima (副島ヒナ, Soejima Hina)
Voiced by: Aya Uchida
Atsushi's classmate, who is good friends with him, the sight of which sets off alarms for onlookers getting the wrong idea. She is going out with Atsushi.
Big Bro Take (タケ兄, Take-Nī)
Voiced by: Takahiro Sakurai
Atsushi and Atsumi's next door neighbor whose face is never seen. He is in his early 30s and is constantly quitting his jobs, resulting in constant unemployment.
Miura
Voiced by: Aya Gouda
A policewoman who knows of Atsushi's predicaments as being mistaken for a pervert. She is very conscious of the fact that she's in danger of becoming an unmarried old maid.
Kijima (木島)
Voiced by: Satomi Akesaka
A policewoman who constantly has to deal with Atsushi whenever he is mistaken for a pervert.
Aono
Voiced by: Nanami Kashiyama
Another policewoman who knows of Atsushi's predicaments. She is a chipper policewoman, but sometimes she goes overboard, usually to Miura's disadvantage.
Kawauchi-sensei
Voiced by: Mai Iizuka
She is the trainee teacher in Atsushi's elementary school who is dismayed by Atsushi's behavior despite looking like the man of her dreams, forcing her to develop a hidden obsession for the boy.
Yoshioka (吉岡)
Voiced by: Junichi Suwabe
A student at Atsumi's school who is an open lolicon and considers Atsumi to be a 'legal loli'.
Makoto Kobayashi (小林マコト, Kobayashi Makoto)
Voiced by: Maki Ino
Yoshioka's underclassman who is the other shortest (second shortest) student in his school besides Atsumi.
Yoshioka's older brother (Yoshioka no aniki)
Voiced by: Hikaru Midorikawa
While the younger Yoshioka has a fetish for young girls, his older brother has a fetish for mature women, much to Miura's dismay.
Midori (美鳥)
Voiced by: Nanami Kashiyama
A friend and classmate of Hina and Atsushi. She has dark brown hair that is worn in two wavy pigtails.
Jun (ジュン)
Voiced by: Sayaka Toujou
Another friend and classmate of Hina and Atsushi. She has purplish black hair that is styled in a bob cut.

== Media ==
=== Manga ===
The original manga series by Meme Higashiya began serialization in Takeshobo's Manga Club Original and Manga Life Original from March 27, 2007. The series was added to the digital manga distribution website JManga on March 6, 2012.

=== Anime ===
An anime adaptation of Recorder and Randsell, separated into two seasons titled Do♪ and Re♪, aired on TV Saitama between January 5 and June 27, 2012. It was also simulcast by Crunchyroll. The series was released in two BD/DVD volumes on April 20, 2012, and July 20, 2012, respectively, featuring bonus episodes. A third season, Mi♪, began airing in July 2013. The ending theme for the first season is "Glitter" by Aoi Tada feat. Sister 773 whilst the second season's ending theme is "Stare" by Paprika and the third season's ending is "One, Two, Hello" (ワンツーハロー, Wan Tsū Harō) by Nanami Kashiyama.
