= The Otome Heroine's Fight for Survival =

Japanese light novel series

- First light novel volume cover

乙女ゲームのヒロインで最強サバイバル (Otome Gēmu no Hiroin de Saikyō Sabaibaru)
- Genre: Fantasy
- Novel series
- Written by: Harunohi Biyori
- Published by: Shōsetsuka ni Narō
- Original run: March 9, 2019 – May 22, 2022
- Light novel
- Written by: Harunohi Biyori
- Illustrated by: Hitaki Yuu
- Published by: TO Books
- English publisher: NA: J-Novel Club
- Imprint: TO Bunko
- Original run: April 10, 2021 – present
- Volumes: 11
- Manga
- Written by: Harunohi Biyori
- Illustrated by: Kobato Wakasa
- Published by: TO Books
- English publisher: NA: J-Novel Club
- Imprint: Corona Comics
- Magazine: Comic Corona
- Original run: August 30, 2021 – present
- Volumes: 8
- Anime television series
- Directed by: Tokihiro Sasaki
- Written by: Touko Machida
- Music by: Kohta Yamamoto; Shun Narita; Yuki Furuhashi
- Studio: Studio Clutch; Seven
- Original run: July 2027 – scheduled

The Otome Heroine's Fight for Survival (Japanese: 乙女ゲームのヒロインで最強サバイバル, Hepburn: Otome Gēmu no Hiroin de Saikyō Sabaibaru) is a Japanese light novel series written by Harunohi Biyori and illustrated by Hitaki Yuu. It was originally published as a web novel series on the Shōsetsuka ni Narō website from March 2019 to May 2022, before beginning print publication by TO Books in April 2021. A manga adaptation illustrated by Kobato Wakasa began serialization on the Nico Nico Seiga website under TO Books' Comic Corona brand in August 2021. An anime television series adaptation produced by Studio Clutch and Seven is set to premiere in July 2027.

== Premise ==
Alicia is fated to escape her life of orphaned poverty and be taken in by her noble grandfather, as was the plot of the otome game Ciel. However, one completely insane reincarnated woman throws off everything meant to happen; attempting to steal Alicia's body and life. However, Alicia snaps and kills her instead, gaining the knowledge of the life Ciel had set for her. Disgusted that she lost her parents just to give her a sympathetic background and make her an unwilling seductress in school, Alicia decides to live as she wants.

Normally that would be the end of it and Alicia would be free of her destiny, but two wild cards cause further disruption to the narrative. Another orphan finds the crystal with the woman's memories and takes Alicia's place; having a wicked heart. One of the girls meant to bully Alicia awakens memories of his past life and thinks the only way to escape her horrible fate is to kill the heroine before the story starts.

== Characters ==
Alicia Melrose / Alia
Voiced by: Fūka Izumi
An orphan who realizes she is actually the protagonist of the otome game Ciel after a reincarnated woman tried to take over her body. Disgusted that her horrible life is just a backstory to set up the game, she turns from a pure girl into a jaded, cold person. Vowing to get stronger to avoid the original plot, she begins employing all sorts of methods to quickly raise her stats, including working as a combat maid, assassin, and adventurer. However, she ironically still ends up crossing paths with the original story's other major characters during her various jobs.
Unnamed woman
A reincarnator who was reborn into her favorite otome game, Ciel, only to be distraught that she did not become the main character, Alicia. As a result, she unsuccessfully attempted to take over Alicia's body using magic, causing the latter to realize she is a character in a game, resulting in her being killed by the enraged heroine. However, her lingering malice possessed another orphan girl, who would later attempt to take Alicia's place in the original plot after the heroine abandons it.
Clara Dandorl
A reincarnator who was reborn into the otome game Ciel as a noble girl who bullies Alicia and gets exiled during the ending. She constantly worries about changing her fate, believing that addressing her behavior is not enough. Because of this, she becomes uncomfortable and confused when she crosses paths with Alia, not understanding the altered plot.
Elena Claydale
Princess of the kingdom and the cousin of Clara. Her childhood lacked any love, due to her mother forcing her to train for the throne; even forcing cultivation of four magic types. However, this caused the mana stone in her heart to get too big and take a toll on Elena's future health; rendering her almost infertile.
Elena becomes good friends with Alia, whom each promise to help each other; Alia promising to kill one person on her request, while Elena promises to get Aria out of legal trouble once.
Viro
A member of the Rainbow Blade, an S Rank adventurer party. Having been asked to find useful children who could be taught to serve younger nobles, he finds and recruits Alia.
As a scout, he becomes Alia's second mentor and teaches her valuable skills.
Sera Leighton
Head maid at the Claydale resort estate and a high-ranking member of the Order of Shadows, Claydale's secret agency. After seeing Alia defeating dangerous monsters without help and suspecting that she might be the granddaughter her liege lord is looking for, Sera hires her as an apprentice combat maid; teaching her the skills and manners needed to blend in for the job.
Theo Leighton
Sera's son. After an embarrassing first encounter with Alia, he falls in love with her.
He was meant to be Alicia's butler in the game, but becomes the fake Alicia's butler instead.

== Media ==
=== Light novel ===
Written by Harunohi Biyori, The Otome Heroine's Fight for Survival was serialized on Shōsetsuka ni Narō from March 9, 2019, to May 22, 2022. It was later acquired by TO Books who began publishing it as a light novel with illustrations by Hitaki Yuu under their TO Bunko imprint on April 10, 2021. Eleven volumes have been released as of June 15, 2026.

During their panel at Anime NYC 2023, J-Novel Club announced that they had licensed the series for English publication.

No.	Original release date	Original ISBN	North American release date	North American ISBN
1	April 10, 2021	978-4-86699-193-1	March 11, 2024	978-1-71831-148-0
2	October 20, 2021	978-4-86699-354-6	July 26, 2024	978-1-71831-150-3
3	February 19, 2022	978-4-86699-454-3	November 8, 2024	978-1-71831-152-7
4	July 20, 2022	978-4-86699-580-9	February 21, 2025	978-1-71831-154-1
5	December 20, 2022	978-4-86699-728-5	June 30, 2025	978-1-71831-156-5
6	June 10, 2023	978-4-86699-859-6	March 13, 2026	978-1-71831-158-9
7	January 15, 2024	978-4-86794-049-5	January 29, 2027	978-1-71831-160-2
8	June 10, 2024	978-4-86794-216-1	—	—
9	January 15, 2025	978-4-86794-431-8	—	—
10	October 15, 2025	978-4-86794-745-6	—	—
11	June 15, 2026	978-4-86854-030-4	—	—

=== Manga ===
A manga adaptation illustrated by Kobato Wakasa began serialization on the Nico Nico Seiga website under TO Books' Comic Corona brand on August 30, 2021. The manga's chapters have been collected into nine tankōbon volumes as of October 2026. The manga adaptation is also licensed by J-Novel Club.

No.	Original release date	Original ISBN	North American release date	North American ISBN
1	February 15, 2022	978-4-86699-451-2	April 3, 2024	978-1-71837-110-1
2	September 15, 2022	978-4-86699-666-0	June 12, 2024	978-1-71837-111-8
3	June 1, 2023	978-4-86699-856-5	April 2, 2025	978-1-71837-112-5
4	January 15, 2024	978-4-86794-055-6	June 11, 2025	978-1-71837-113-2
5	June 15, 2024	978-4-86794-204-8	November 12, 2025	978-1-71837-114-9
6	January 15, 2025	978-4-86794-414-1	January 21, 2026	978-1-71837-115-6
7	August 15, 2025	978-4-86794-659-6	August 12, 2026	978-1-71837-116-3
8	January 15, 2026	978-4-86794-835-4	October 7, 2026	978-1-71837-117-0
9	October 15, 2026	978-4-86854-152-3	—	—

=== Anime ===
An anime adaptation was announced on January 10, 2025. It was later confirmed to be a television series that will be produced by Studio Clutch and Seven and directed by Tokihiro Sasaki, with Touko Machida handilng series composition, Hiroyuki Miseki designing the characters, and Kohta Yamamoto, Shun Narita and Yuki Furuhashi composing the music. The series is set to premiere in July 2027.

== See also ==
- Even Given the Worthless "Appraiser" Class, I'm Actually the Strongest, another light novel series with the same illustrator
