= Rekka Katakiri =

Japanese singer

Rekka Katakiri 片霧烈火
- Also known as: Mitama Tenrou (天弄御魂)
- Genre: Anison
- Occupation: Singer
- Instrument: Vocals
- Labels: KNS Entertainment, Team Entertainment, Closed/Underground
- Website: www.rekka.jp

Rekka Katakiri (片霧烈火, Katakiri Rekka; born December 8) is a female Japanese singer under the self-published label Closed/Underground. She has released several songs that have served as theme songs for anime shows, including Higurashi When They Cry, My Wife is the Student Council President, Shin Koihime Muso, and Kokoro Connect.

== Discography ==
=== Albums ===
List of albums, with selected chart positions
Title	Album information	Oricon
Title	Album information	Peak position
Min no Uta (みんのうた。)	Released: November 3, 2004; Label: KNS Entertainment; Catalog No.: AKCI-26017	
Sora no Kishimi to Yugameru Sekai no Naki, Koe (空の軋みと歪める世界の無き、声)	Released: January 25, 2006; Label: KNS Entertainment; Catalog No.: AKCI-26047	300
Girls Life (がーるず・らいふ, Gāruzuraifu)	Released: June 28, 2006; Label: (independent); Catalog No.: SDCR-0002	236
Kinema in the Hole (キネマ・イン・ザ・ホール, Kinema in za hōru)	Released: April 25, 2007; Label: Team Entertainment; Catalog No.: KDSD-0040	
Girls v Life 2 (がーるずvらいふ2, Ga ̄ruzu v-ra ifu 2)	Released: June 25, 2008; Label: (independent); Catalog No.: SDCR-0016	167
12:12:24	Released: May 19, 2010; Label: Team Entertainment; Catalog No.: KDSD-00369	149
History of WORXSONGz (Closed/Underground Chronicle Vol. 7 1999–2009)	Released: April 13, 2011; Label: Team Entertainment; Format: CD; Note: Catalog No.: KDSD-00421 (vol. 1), KDSD-00424 (vol. 2), KDSD-20011 (premium box)	49
Closed/Underground Chronicle vol.09 LTN is beginning	Released: April 4, 2012; Label: Team Entertainment; Catalog No.: KDSD-00507	
Rīzu no atorie ~ orudōru no renkinjutsu-shi ~ orijinarusaundotorakku puremiamu pakku (リーズのアトリエ～オルドールの錬金術士～ オリジナルサウンドトラック プレミアムパック, Alchemist Original Soundtrack premium pack of Leeds of Atelier Orudoru)	Released: March 21, 2007; Label: Team Entertainment; Catalog Number: KDSD10020, KDSD10021-23	

=== Singles ===
List of singles, with selected chart positions
Title	Single information	Oricon
Title	Single information	Peak position
"why, or why not" Ending song for Higurashi When They Cry	Released: June 28, 2006; Label: Frontier Works; Catalog No.: FCCM-0136	
"Tōen Ketsuge ~Tōen no Chikai~" (闘艶結議～トウエンノチカイ～); Opening theme song for Shin Koihime Muso	Released: November 18, 2009; Label: Pony Canyon; Catalog No.: PCCG-70048	31
"Yakusoku no sekai" (約束の世界; Promise of the World)	Released: June 22, 2011; Label: b-green; Catalog No.: QECB-30	192
"Koisuru Hiyoko" (恋する☆ひよこ); Theme song for My Wife is the Student Council President	Released: August 22, 2015; Label: Studio Chant	

== Filmography ==
List of voice performances
Year	Title	Role	Notes	Source
2001	Simple 1500 Vol. 71: The Renai Simulation 2: Fureai; SIMPLE1500シリーズ Vol.71 THE 恋愛シミュレーション2 ～ふれあい～	Yuki Aihara	PS1/PS2	
2005	Animamundi アニマムンディ 終りなき闇の舞踏	Timothy Leary	PC game	
2007	Princess Nightmare	Cheshire	PC	
2011	Chaos Code	Kagari	Arcade	
