= Panpaka Pants =

Japanese anime television series

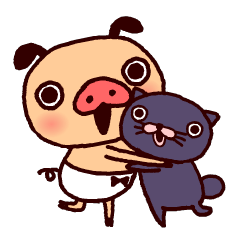
- Panpaka and Punyan, the main characters of the anime Panpaka Pants

パンパカパンツ (Panpaka Pantsu)
- Genre: Comedy, adventure
- Anime film

Panpaka Pants: Treasure of The Bananan Kingdom
- Directed by: Benpi Neko
- Produced by: Ryuuta Shiiki
- Studio: DLE
- Released: June 10, 2014
- Runtime: 60 mins
- Anime television series
- Directed by: Benpi Neko
- Produced by: Ryuuta Shiiki
- Music by: Fumihiro Kojima
- Studio: DLE
- Original network: SBS; Kids Station
- Original run: April 4, 2015 – present
- Episodes: 26

Panpaka Pants (パンパカパンツ, Panpakapantsu) is a Japanese anime series set in Shizuoka Prefecture, Japan developed by DLE. The series follows the adventures of Panpaka (a piglet boy) and his best friend cat, Punyan, as they go on various adventures in search of special pants (underwear, not trousers). The series began in 2008 as a series of 1-minute shorts on local television, before being picked up to series in 2015.

As of 2016, two season have been released in Japan on Shizuoka Broadcasting System's channel and Kids Station in Japan, and a third season is currently airing in South Korea. Each season has 26 episodes that last from one to five minutes. A feature film was released in 2014, titled Panpaka Pants: Treasure of The Bananan Kingdom.

The series title is a pun on the Japanese phrase "panpakapan" (ぱんぱかぱん), which roughly translates to "surprise" in English.

== Plot ==
In Shizuoka Prefecture, Japan lives the Pants family, a family of pigs who love pants. Their family lineage has been charged with securing the world's most sacred pants for generations. Now, this mission has been entrusted to the son of the family, Panpaka. Along with his best friend, Punyan (a purple cat), the two travel around the world looking for various pants. During their adventures, they encounter various other allies with their own unique problems. What ensues are surreal comedic situations, most of the time ending with Panpaka and Punyan getting the "special" pants they were searching for, but with some disappointment.

== Characters ==
=== Main characters ===
Panpaka (パンパカくん, Panpakakun)

Voiced by: Yoshino Nanjō
The main character of the series. Panpaka is a piglet boy who loves pants. He's known for embarking on daring adventures, and will do anything to obtain the world's most sacred pants.
Panpaka is usually found wearing only his signature white briefs. His character design is based upon the character of Taisuke from the original Panpaka Pants 1-minute short.
The Japanese voice for Panpaka, Yoshino Nanjō, is also a native of Shizuoka Prefecture, the setting of the series.

Punyan (プーニャン, Pūnyan)

Voiced by: Kaoru Mizuhara
The Pants family's pet cat, and Panpaka's best friend. Although Punyan may not be able to say anything other than his name, he's the smartest one of the duo. He helps to keep Panpaka out of danger on his adventures. Despite being the more responsible one, Punyan is still a cat, and finds himself falling victim to simple tricks like the opening of a can of cat food.

Boark (ブラックパンパカ, Burakku Panpaka)

Voiced by: Shinya Takahashi
The main antagonist of the series. Boark is a "Pants Hunter," someone who tracks down the world's most valuable pants, and keeps it for himself to enjoy. He considers Panpaka his rival, even though if Panpaka doesn't see Boark in the same way.
His eye-patch and dark hair make him stand out.

Croli (クロり, Kurori)

Voiced by: Mariko Kouda
Boark's right-hand cat. Croli has an aristocratic air about her. Although she's far more witty than Boark, she chooses to follow him to get the opportunity to do something mischievous.

=== Supporting characters ===
==== Pants Family ====
Pops (お父さん, Otōsan)

Mom (お母さん, Okaasan)

Grandpa (お爺さん, Ojiisan)

Voiced by: Youji Ueda
Despite his old age, Panpaka's Grandpa is a feisty person. He bestowed the family mission of finding pants onto Panpaka, and even aids Panpaka on his quest now and then.

Grandma (お婆ちゃん, Obaachan)

Voiced by: Hana Satou
Panpaka's grandmother, Grandma is a quiet old lady who enjoys sipping tea. She's rarely active, and enjoys peace. However, in her youth Grandma was once a club DJ known as DJ Pants.

== Production ==
Panpaka Pants began as series of 1-minute-long shorts within Shizuoka Prefecture in Japan. The shorts consisted of a song and dance segments. The main characters of these shorts were four pig characters named Taisuke, Jiro, Oshi, and Keiko. It wouldn't be until the third series of shorts when a character which resembled Taisuke named Panpaka became the main character of the series.

Panpaka Pants aired along with six other titles during a programming block on Shizuoka Broadcasting System's local TV channel. Of the six, only Panpaka Pants was ordered to series. Panpaka Pants first appeared as a standalone movie in 2014, titled "Panpaka Pants: Treasure of The Bananan Kingdom."

== Shorts ==
The shorts were developed by DLE, and were broadcast in collaboration with Shizuoka Broadcasting System. The shorts were aimed primarily at small children.

The shorts were syndicated to TV Tokyo in 2012, where it went on to gain mass popularity. In the third batch of shorts, the format was changed slightly with the four original characters being replaced with a single main character named Panpaka.

Panpaka Pants made its international debut in 2013 when the shorts began broadcasting in Taiwan.

== Series ==
In 2015, Panpaka Pants was picked up for a nationally syndicated television series under the title Oh NEW! Panpaka Pants (おNEW!パンパカパンツ, o new! panpakapantsu). The series is made up of 5-minutes, and takes place in Shizuoka Prefecture. DLE purchased the animation rights to the series, with SBS becoming one of the sponsors for the title. Season one for the series aired on April 4, 2015, and ran for 26 episodes.

A second season, titled W Oh NEW! Panpaka Pants (WおNEW!パンパカパンツ, w o new! panpakapantsu) began airing on SBS on April 2, 2016, followed by a nationwide syndication on Kids Station on June 18, 2016. The season had 26 episodes.

The second season is also currently syndicated on South Korea's Toonverse anime and cartoon television channel under the title of Pambara Pantsu 2. Panpaka Pants had the highest viewership ratings on Toonverse for the 4-13 year old age block.

== Other media ==
=== Film ===
A feature film for Panpaka Pants was released by Toho Films on May 10, 2014. Titled Panpaka Pants The Movie: Treasure of the Bananan Kingdom (えいがパンパカパンツ バナナン王国の秘宝, Eiga Panpakapantsu Banananoukoku no Hihou), the movie found Panpaka and Punyan separated from their family during a family vacation, and ending up in the jungle nation of the Bananan Kingdom. Bananan Kingdom is being tormented by the Alligator King, who took all the bananas of the kingdom, forcing the Bananan Kingdom's citizens to eat nothing but ice cream. There, Panpaka and Punyan are mistaken by the king as the "Legendary Pants Hero," and is entrusted in retrieving the "sacred pants". He is joined by Wanpoko The Dog, Orson The Crane, and Terry The Monkey.

=== Line Stamps ===
Panpaka Pants releases a series of LINE stamps. The stamps are reportedly the main driving vehicle for the character's popularity within Japan. As of November 2016, 10 different sets of stamps have been released. "Animated and voiced" stamps began at the 3rd set release, with Yoshino Nanjō reprising her voice as Panpaka.

The stamps are released in multiple territories outside Japan, including the United States, China, South Korea, and Brazil, amongst many others. In all territories it was released, Panpaka Pants' LINE stamps ranked 1st in weekly sales.
