= Ai-Mai-Mi =

Japanese manga series

- Cover of the first manga volume

あいまいみー (Ai Mai Mī)
- Genre: Surreal comedy
- Manga
- Written by: Choborau Nyopomi
- Published by: Takeshobo
- Magazine: Manga Life Win
- Original run: June 2009 – May 2021
- Volumes: 11
- Anime television series
- Directed by: Itsuki Imazaki
- Music by: Fūga Hatori
- Studio: Seven
- Original network: AT-X, TV Saitama, KBS
- Original run: January 3, 2013 – March 28, 2013
- Episodes: 13
- Anime television series

Ai-Mai-Mi: Mousou Catastrophe
- Directed by: Itsuki Imazaki
- Music by: Fūga Hatori studioCHANT
- Studio: Seven
- Original network: AT-X, TV Saitama, KBS, tvk, Sun TV
- Original run: July 8, 2014 – September 23, 2014
- Episodes: 12
- Anime television series

Ai-Mai-Mi: Surgical Friends
- Directed by: Itsuki Imazaki
- Music by: Fūga Hatori
- Studio: Seven
- Original network: AT-X, TV Saitama, KBS, tvk, Sun TV
- Original run: January 3, 2017 – March 21, 2017
- Episodes: 12

Ai-Mai-Mi (あいまいみー, Ai Mai Mī) is a Japanese yonkoma online manga series written and illustrated by Choborau Nyopomi. It has been adapted into an anime television series. A second season was announced on the anime's website in the beginning of April. A third season was announced in November 2016 and premiered in January 2017.

Ponoka-senpai's shell-shocked reaction to a forex market crash from volume 2 of the manga and episode 9 of the anime became an internet meme called "The face of the people who sank all their money into the FX" (FXで有り金全部溶かす人の顔). In 2014, DMM FX, the world's second largest forex company by trading volume at the time, had a collaboration with Ai Mai Mi where new users could receive T-shirts with Ponoka's glassy expression on them.

== Plot ==
The story follows the lives of the girls Ai, Mai, Mi and Ponoka-senpai, who together form the "Manga Club" where they fight against alien invaders, face fierce rivals and do all sorts of crazy things when they are not drawing manga.

== Characters ==
- Ai (voiced by Yuka Ōtsubo) is the most level headed girl in the club, and the only one who draws manga, but occasionally she participates in her friends' antics.
- Mai (voiced by Aya Uchida) is a classmate of Ai and a childhood friend of Mi. She has a naive and affectionate demeanor, but she can be shown sadistic at times.
- Mi (voiced by Maaya Uchida) is a classmate of Ai and childhood friend of Mai. She is the perpetrator of most of the group's antics and even takes them to extremes not condoned by everyone else. She makes herself out to be brave but can be a coward at times.
- Ponoko-Senpai (voiced by Ai Kayano) is an upper classman in the group's school. She fixes most of the gang's problems with a clay pot.
