= Paradise of Innocence =

Japanese manga series

- First tankōbon volume cover

無邪気の楽園 (Mujaki no Rakuen)
- Genre: Erotic comedy
- Manga
- Written by: Uran
- Published by: Hakusensha
- Magazine: Young Animal Arashi
- Original run: April 2, 2010 – September 1, 2017
- Volumes: 13
- Original animation DVD
- Directed by: Hideki Araki (1); Takashi Nishikawa (2–3)
- Produced by: Takashi Nishigata; Masao Nakamura (1); Junji Kamejima (1–2); Kenji Fujiwara (2); Taku Horie (3); Kenji Fujikaze (3); Takahiro Taniguchi (3)
- Music by: Himeko Yamamoto
- Studio: Office No. 8 (1); Seven (2–3)
- Released: August 29, 2014 – August 29, 2016
- Runtime: 26 minutes
- Episodes: 3
- Manga

Paradise of Innocence Parallel
- Written by: Uran
- Published by: Hakusensha
- Magazine: Young Animal Arashi
- Original run: November 2, 2017 – May 2, 2018

Paradise of Innocence (Japanese: 無邪気の楽園, Hepburn: Mujaki no Rakuen) is a Japanese manga series written and illustrated by Uran. It was serialized in Hakusensha's Young Animal Arashi from April 2010 to September 2017. An spin-off, titled Paradise of Innocence Parallel, was serialized in the same magazine from November 2017 to May 2018. The chapters were compiled in 13 tankōbon volumes.

A three-episode original animation DVD (OAD) was released from August 2014 to August 2016.

== Characters ==
Shōta Handa (反田省太, Handa Shōta)
Voiced by: Yasuaki Takumi
Konomi Harukaze (春風 このみ, Harukaze Konomi)
Voiced by: Mayuka Nomura
Manatsu Kamiya (神谷 真夏, Kamiya Manatsu)
Voiced by: Sachie Hirai
Rio Kaneko (金子 梨央, Kaneko Rio)
Voiced by: Ayano Niina
Nako Sasaki (佐々木 奈子, Sasaki Nako)
Voiced by: Nana Inoue
Sayo Ikenohata (池之端 サヨ, Ikenohata Sayo)
Voiced by: Kanami Satō

== Media ==
=== Manga ===
Written and illustrated by Uran, Paradise of Innocence was serialized in Hakusensha's Young Animal Arashi from April 2, 2010, to May 2, 2018. A spin-off, titled Paradise of Innocence Parallel (無邪気の楽園パラレル, Mujaki no Rakuen Parareru), was serialized in Young Animal Arashi from November 2, 2017, to May 2, 2018. Hakusensha collected its chapters, including Paradise of Innocence Parallel, in 13 tankōbon volumes, released from February 29, 2012, to July 27, 2018.

=== Original animation DVD ===
An original animation DVD (OAD) was bundled with the manga sixth limited-edition volume on August 29, 2014. A second OAD was bundled with the manga eighth limited-edition volume on August 28, 2015. A third and final OAD was bundled with the manga 10th limited-edition volume on August 29, 2016. Hideki Araki directed the first OAD at Office No. 8, while Takashi Nishikawa directed the last two OADs at Seven.

== Reception ==
In May 2015, it was announced that the print editions of the manga would be removed from Amazon Japan due to the revised Youth Healthy Development Ordinance laws.

THEM Anime Reviews gave the OAD 1 out of 5 stars. The reviewer criticized the series for its content, involving minors in sexual situations, and wrote: "While I could complain more about the crappy art and animation or the stupidity of the concept, that would ultimately give it too much credit. It is twenty-six minutes of watching fifth graders get aroused while being around a pedophile, and that is all you need to know".
