= My Wife Is the Student Council President =

Japanese manga series

- My Wife Is the Student Council President!
- Cover of Okusama ga Seitokaichō! volume 1 by Ichijinsha featuring the character Ui Wakana

おくさまが生徒会長！ (Okusama ga Seito Kaichō!)
- Genre: Erotic comedy
- Manga
- Written by: Yumi Nakata
- Published by: Ichijinsha
- Magazine: Comic Rex
- Original run: January 21, 2012 – November 27, 2018
- Volumes: 13
- Anime television series
- Directed by: Hiroyuki Furukawa
- Produced by: Dream Creation; Asuka Yamazaki; Gorō Shinjuku; Hideyuki Saida; Koichi Ishii; Taku Horie
- Written by: Makoto Takada
- Music by: Dax Production; Fuuga Hatori
- Studio: Seven
- Original network: AT-X, TVS, KBS, tvk, Sun TV
- Original run: July 2, 2015 – September 17, 2015
- Episodes: 12 + OVA
- Anime television series

My Wife is the Student Council President!+!
- Directed by: Hiroyuki Furukawa (chief); Tokihiro Sasaki
- Produced by: Dream Creation; Haruhisa Ishizuka; Koichi Ishii; Gorō Shinjuku; Hideyuki Saida; Asuka Yamazaki; Taku Horie
- Written by: Makoto Takada
- Music by: studio CHANT; Fuuga Hatori
- Studio: Seven
- Licensed by: NA: Crunchyroll
- Original network: AT-X, TVS, tvk, KBS, Sun TV
- Original run: October 2, 2016 – December 18, 2016
- Episodes: 12
- icon

My Wife Is the Student Council President (Japanese: おくさまが生徒会長！, Hepburn: Okusama ga Seito Kaichō!) is a Japanese manga series by Yumi Nakata. It began serialization in Ichijinsha's shōnen manga magazine Comic Rex and ran from 2011 to 2018 and collected in thirteen tankōbon volumes. The story originally started in 2007 as a hentai manga called Okusama wa Seito Kaichō (奥さまは生徒会長), which published in a single tankōbon volume by Jitsugyo no Nihon Sha, Ltd. in 2007. An anime television series adaptation produced by Seven aired from July to September 2015. A second season aired from October 2 to December 18, 2016.

== Plot ==
Hayato Izumi runs for student council president at his new high school but loses to Ui Wakana, a perky and charismatic girl who pledges to liberate love on campus and throws condoms into the audience during her election speech. He ends up becoming the vice-president of the student council. He soon learns that due to an arrangement by their parents, Ui becomes his fiancée, and they have to live together.

He tries to keep their cohabitation a secret from the school and its all-female student council leadership while fending off Ui's progressively aggressive romantic and sexual advances at home. Ui's personality and her actions put her in direct conflict with the discipline committee. Rin Misumi, the head of the committee, frequently comes into conflict with the student council. Hayato starts attracting the discipline head's attention through various meetings and coincidences, who later moves in next door with her sister Kei, the school's nurse.

As the school year progresses, Rin takes a progressively leading role, with her conflict as the discipline chair and her feeling towards Hayato taking center stage, often overshadowing the series' title character.

== Characters ==
Ui Wakana (若菜 羽衣, Wakana Ui)
Voiced by: Ayana Taketatsu (anime), Natsumi Takamori (drama CD) (Japanese); Brittany Lauda (English)
Ui becomes the student council president following her campaign to spread love over the school where she passed out condoms. She moves into Hayato's apartment as his fiancée in an arranged marriage. She is noticeably less serious at "home," where she cannot cook for herself, often slacks off, and completely acts dependent on Hayato. A running gag in the series is that baby chicks appear on the top of her head whenever she gets in a depressed or pensive mood.^{Ch. 1-2} Throughout the series, she tries to please Hayato romantically and even sexually, knowing very little about doing it properly. Once Rin appears and becomes a recurring character, Ui develops an inferiority complex around her breasts, making her wish her figure was more like Rin.^{Ch. 7}

Hayato Izumi (和泉 隼人, Izumi Hayato)
Voiced by: Kazuyuki Okitsu (Japanese); Matt Shipman (English)
Hayato is a serious individual who is the vice-president of the student council. He is set up with Ui Wakana in an arranged marriage and must live with her in his apartment. Despite his ever-growing respect for Ui throughout the series, he often gets caught in her romantic advances. It makes him uncomfortable yet aroused. Hayato is notably self-sufficient, having cooked and cleaned for himself before Ui's arrival.^{Ch. 1} He is impulsive and doesn't think things through, so he gets caught up with many other sexual situations with the rest of the female cast, especially Rin. He develops a fetish for huge breasts after being in constant contact with Rin, much to the chagrin of Ui.^{Ch. 25} Throughout the series, he dithers between his relationship with Ui, and his fascination with Rin's body, providing a principal source of conflict among the female cast.

Ayane Niikura (新倉 あやね, Niikura Ayane)
Voiced by: Aoi Fujimoto (anime), Yuki Horinaka (drama CD)
The student council secretary. She likes to dress up in frilly outfits and cat ears. She is a bit spacey and absent-minded.^{Ch. 4}

Karen Fujisaki (藤咲 可憐, Fujisaki Karen)
Voiced by: Yoshie Sugiyama (anime), Asami Shimoda (drama CD)
The student council treasurer. She is petite and is very devoted to Ui, harboring a perverted interest in her. She dislikes Hayato and often comes in conflict with him.^{Ch. 17}

Rin Misumi (三隅 倫, Misumi Rin)
Voiced by: Minami Tsuda (anime), Yuri Komagata (drama CD)
The head of the disciplinary committee, Rin dislikes Ui's love campaign and its related antics; however, she develops feelings for Hayato after he treats her nicely and helps her in a situation.^{Ch. 7} She and her sister move in next door to Hayato.^{Ch. 16} Before the summer festival, Rin accidentally reveals that she wore a bra that made her breasts look smaller because she was self-conscious of the attention the guys gave to them.^{Ch. 25} Rin later finds out Hayato and Ui's cohabitation indirectly from her sister that causes her to become extremely jealous.^{Ch. 33} In the anime, Rin explains that she joined the committee because she wanted to disavow a rumor that she was seducing guys with her huge breasts by emphasizing her morally pure side.^{ep 4}

The manga later reveals that Rin was a childhood friend of Ui and Hayato, and the plot point never gets brought up again.^{Ch. 48} The second season of the anime also alluded to this plot point in the opening, and like the manga, it never gets developed further. Ikoma states that Rin is enormously popular among the incoming freshman class because of her kindness and sense of style. In the second year of high school, Rin becomes part of the same class as the cast.^{Ch. 54} Rin Misumi's enormous popularity in Japan and abroad led her to become a focal point in the manga, often overshadowing Ui and sidelining her. The anime adaptation cut several manga scenes and story arcs that prominently featured Rin. The imagery and original art of this character still play a leading role in the marketing of the series; long after completion.

Makoto Sawatari (猿渡 真都, Sawatari Makoto)
Voiced by: Juri Nagatsuma
A petite girl who looks after Rin like Karen does with Ui. She has a collection of pictures of Rin in embarrassing situations.^{Ch. 14} While she does many perverted actions towards Rin, she genuinely cares for her as a friend and confidante.

Misato Wakana (若菜 みさと, Wakana Misato)
Voiced by: Tomoko Kaneda
Misato is Ui's energetic and playful mother. Her petite stature makes everyone think she is Ui's little sister.^{Ch. 10}

Kei Misumi (三隅 慧, Misumi Kei)
Voiced by: Ryoko Shiraishi
Rin's sister is the school nurse who casually dresses in sexually suggestive clothing and whose behaviors annoy Rin.^{Ch. 7} She and Rin move into the apartment next door to Hayato.^{Ch. 16} She later learns of their cohabitation from Ui's parents and keeps it a secret from Rin, ^{Ch. 24} but later accidentally reveals it to her.^{Ch. 33} She teases Hayato when she noticed his gaze and divulges that Rin is larger. While she support's her sister's love, she also uses it as a source of teasing and amusement. According to the behind-the-scenes planning included in the manga, Rin was originally going to have a brother. This plan changed before publication to become Kei Misumi.

Ryuji Wakana (若菜 竜二, Wakana Ryuji)
Voiced by: Yū Kobayashi
Ui's father whose youthful appearance makes him look more like her little brother.^{Ch. 24} He is severe and strict, although when he is pensive, little rats appear atop his head much like his daughter with the baby chicks.^{Ch. 24}

Honoka Saijō (西条ほのか, Saijō Honoka)
Voiced by: Sora Tokui
President of the Photography club. She is cheerful and energetic and is constantly looking out for any good photo opportunities that cause her to regularly contact the disciplinary committee and/or the student council. Her photography club runs an underground website that sells voyeuristic pictures of the school's female students online. They use the club's all-female members to take candid photos of other students or set up hidden cameras in the toilets and changing rooms. Honoka later reveals that some pictures were faked by using the club's members as models and then editing other students' faces.^{Ch. 28} The student council destroys the SD card that contains all their racy files of the female students. Ui puts Honoka on the right path by making her the official festival photographer after Ui and Rin's (forced) approval. Honoka starts developing talent and skill for photography, yet she still needs Rin to reign her perverted tendencies.

Kenta Ikoma (生駒健太)
A younger male student who has a crush on Ui Wakana, introduced at the end of volume 6, was never animated in the two seasons of the anime series. He confesses to Ui constantly and gets rejected swiftly. Upon getting into high school, he joins the student council. After learning of Ui's arranged marriage with Hayato, he starts to fall for Makoto and Ayane.^{Ch. 56}

== Media ==
=== Manga ===
The series compiled into thirteen tankōbon volumes between January 2012 and November 2018. This series was a major success for the publisher and the manga artist, selling 1 million copies by volume 11. On February 25, 2018, the publisher announced that the series would end in the 13th volume.

No.	Release date	ISBN
1	January 21, 2012	978-4-7580-6293-0
2	July 28, 2012	978-4-7580-6322-7
3	June 28, 2013	978-4-7580-6354-8
4	July 28, 2013	978-4-7580-6392-0
5	June 28, 2014	978-4-7580-6435-4
6	July 27, 2014	978-4-7580-6456-9
7	April 27, 2015	978-4-7580-6503-0
8	July 27, 2015	978-4-7580-6522-1
9	January 27, 2016	978-4-7580-6557-3
10	August 3, 2016	978-4-7580-6603-7
11	April 27, 2017	978-4-7580-6655-6
12	February 27, 2018	978-4-7580-6718-8
13	November 27, 2018	978-4-7580-6771-3

=== Anime ===
An anime adaptation directed by Hiroyuki Furukawa and produced by Seven aired in Japan on the broadcast night of July 1 to September 17, 2015. The show was streamed online with English subtitles on Crunchyroll. The show's opening theme is "Koisuru☆Hiyoko" (恋する☆ひよこ, "Love Chick") by Rekka Katakiri and the first ending theme is "Re×nai Equation" (恋×愛＝イクエイション) by Ayana Taketatsu, while the second ending theme is "Realize" (リアライズ) by Minami Tsuda. An OVA was bundled with the manga's 9th volume on January 27, 2016. It was announced in the March 2016 issue of the Monthly Comic Rex magazine that a second season of the anime was green-lit. The second season aired from October 2 to December 18, 2016. The opening theme for the second season is "Kirakira Explorer" (キラキラ☆エクスプローラ, "Sparkling Explorer") by Rekka Katakiri and the first ending theme is "Koi ni Matsuwaru Etcetera ~Misumi Rin no Baai~" (恋にまつわるエトセトラ～三隅倫の場合～) by Minami Tsuda, while the second theme is "Koi ni Matsuwaru Etcetera ~Saijō Honoka no Baai~" (恋にまつわるエトセトラ～西条ほのかの場合～) by Sora Tokui, and the last ending theme is "Koi ni Matsuwaru Etcetera ~Wakana Ui no Baai~" (恋にまつわるエトセトラ～若菜羽衣の場合～) by Ayana Taketatsu.

Episode list

==== Season 1 ====
No.	Title (Note: All English episode titles are taken from Crunchyroll.)	Original release date
1	"The Student Council President Marries into a Family"; Transliteration: "Seito Kaichō no Totsugisaki" (Japanese: 生徒会長の嫁ぎ先)	July 2, 2015
During the student council election speeches, Ui Wakana promises a liberalization of love, tossing condoms to everyone. Naturally, she wins by a landslide to the dismay of her opponent Hayato Izumi, who becomes her vice president in the student council. After returning from cram school, he discovers Ui in his apartment. She declares that she is his wife because their parents had drunkenly arranged for them to get married when they were 3 years old. When she discovers his stash of dirty magazines, she offers to let him touch her instead.
2	"The Student Council President and Meals in a Home"; Transliteration: "Seito Kaichō to Ouchi Gohan" (Japanese: 生徒会長とおうちごはん)	July 9, 2015
Hayato wakes up to find Ui in his bed, and that she isn't the perfect student like how she presents herself at school and is in fact rather lazy and useless at chores. After making breakfast for her and doing the regular school day, he is surprised to find that she has dressed up in only an apron with a school swimsuit underneath. She tries to cook for him but lacks the ability so he cooks for her again.
3	"The Student Council President and the Hand Holding Experiment"; Transliteration: "Seito Kaichō to Tetsunagi Jikken" (Japanese: 生徒会長と手つなぎ実験)	July 16, 2015
Rin Misumi, the head of the disciplinary committee, is upset that Ui's campaign has led to more public displays of affection. Hayato tries to show her it is no big deal by shaking hands with her but this embarrasses Rin extremely. That night, Ui suggests a hand-holding experiment and tries it out on Hayato that night, but it leads to a more erotic situation.
4	"Shelter from the Rain Without the President"; Transliteration: "Seito kaichō ga inai tokoro de amayadori" (Japanese: 生徒会長がいないところで雨宿り)	July 23, 2015
Rin continues to stop hand holding and public displays of affection by students, but Ui defends their actions. After class, she follows Ui and Hayato, and pulls the latter aside, but because of the rain, they end up sheltering at a love hotel. She explains why she became the head of the discipline committee: to disclaim a rumor that she had seduced a male classmate with her large breasts. She confiscates a love egg that Hayato found in the room and stuffs it in her shirt, but it awkwardly activates and works its way down her body. Ui is shocked to see the two leave the hotel together.
5	"Making Up with the President"; Transliteration: "Seito kaichō to nakanaori no Are" (Japanese: 生徒会長と仲直りのアレ)	July 30, 2015
Ui becomes depressed after seeing Rin and Hayato come out of a love hotel. The council listens to a very similar case during their meeting, with Rin and Hayato vigorously defending the "it was a misunderstanding" side. When they learn in a follow-up email that the couple have made up with a kiss, Ui asks for the same from Hayato afterwards.
6	"The Student Council President's Family"; Transliteration: "Seito kaichō to miuchi cha arimasen" (Japanese: 生徒会長と身内ちゃん)	August 6, 2015
Ui and Hayato receive a surprise visit from Ui's mother Misato, who looks more like Ui's little sister to Hayato's shock. Misato visits Hayato's apartment for dinner, and then shares an awkward bath with him. Ui later gives Hayato a back massage which leads to tickling and foreplay until Misato interrupts.
7	"Sneaky Student Council President"; Transliteration: "Kosokoso seito kaichō" (Japanese: こそこそ生徒会長)	August 13, 2015
Rin and Kei Misumi move in next door to Hayato, who tries to keep his cohabitation a secret. Rin visits Hayato frequently, causing him to try to hide Ui. But Ui gets revenge for his not paying attention to her. Rin finally finds Ui's underwear and lipstick, and Hayato has to claim they are his to cover Ui, leading to a rather embarrassing misunderstanding.
8	"The Vice President and the Two Infirmary Devils"; Transliteration: "Fuku kaichō to hoken-shitsu no akuma 2-hiki" (Japanese: 副会長と保健室の悪魔2匹)	August 20, 2015
As Hayato prepares for a major exam, Rin and Kei notice his bags under his eyes and take him to the nurse's office. Hayato is surprised to learn that Rin told Kei about his alleged cross-dressing secret (the misunderstanding from the previous episode), but collapses before he can do anything about it. Rin and Kei dress Hayato like a girl, but things quickly turn south when Kei offers her panties, Rin offers hers instead, and Hayato ends up waking to an unexpected sight.
9	"President, Bribe, and Exposure"; Transliteration: "Seito kaichō to wairo to bakuro" (Japanese: 生徒会長と賄賂と暴露)	August 27, 2015
Rin gives Hayato a gift bag with panties, while petite girls Sawatari and Karen watch them. Karen tells Ui that Rin is bribing Hayato, which leads Ui into thinking whether she should reveal her relationship secret to Karen and Ayane. When Ui discovers the panties in Hayato's bag, she pulls Hayato to an alley where she insists he remove her panties. After their foreplay is interrupted, Hayato ponders what to do with the panties he received from the two girls.
10	"Sawatari-san's Midsummer Presentation"; Transliteration: "Saruwatari-san no manatsu no purezen" (Japanese: 猿渡さんの真夏のプレゼン)	September 3, 2015
While waiting by the school entrance, Hayato sees Sawatari fall down while carrying a huge backpack, and brings her to the infirmary to rest. Sawatari suspects that Hayato and Ui's relationship is more than it appears, so she follows him home. Things quickly fall apart once she is invited inside.
11	"The President Turns Sixteen"; Transliteration: "Seito kaichō 16-sai ni naru" (Japanese: 生徒会長16歳になる)	September 10, 2015
Sawatari returns Hayato's panties and leaves a thank-you present for him. Ui, who has turned the legal age to marry, thinks the gift is for her and puts on the nightie. At first Hayato is shocked to see her in such daring clothes, but succumbs to her foreplay.
12	"More of the President's Family"; Transliteration: "Kaichō no miuchi-kun" (Japanese: 会長の身内くん)	September 17, 2015
Ui and Hayato receives another surprise visit from Misato at their apartment. This time, Ui's father Ryouji comes along to see if Hayato is suitable to be Ui's husband.
OVA	"Student Council President and Bath Play"; Transliteration: "Seito kaichō to ofuro asobi" (Japanese: 生徒会長とお風呂遊び)	January 27, 2016
At school, Hayato's hand was injured from saving Ui from falling off of the ladder while placing a poster on the school board, then Rin and the others shows up. Later Ui tries to heal Hayato's hand, but things go wrong while bathing.

==== Season 2 ====
No.	Title	Original release date
1	"The Playful Student Council President"; Transliteration: "O tawamure seito kaichō" (Japanese: おたわむれ生徒会長)	October 2, 2016
Hayato explains his relationship with Ui, describing her as having demanded more attention recently. Ui attempts to pleasure Hayato with her foot, but Hayato wants to study and take a bath. Afterwards, Ui is caught pleasuring herself using Hayato's pillow and blanket. She explains she wants greater physical intimacy from Hayato, at which Hayato snaps and jumps on her. But their moment of passion is quickly interrupted by a drunken Kei.
2	"Late Summer Festival with the Disciplinary Committee Head"; Transliteration: "Jajjimento-chō to banka no omatsuri" (Japanese: 風紀委員長と晩夏のお祭り)	October 9, 2016
Hayato accidentally sees Rin topless as they change into yukatas for the summer festival. Rin acts upset during the event, especially when Hayato has been mostly staring at her chest. She later concludes that she isn't bothered when Hayato ogles her, and pulls him aside and has him grope her breasts over her kimono. However, when she unintentionally moans with pleasure, she is embarrassed and angry, and punches Hayato. After they return to the others, Ui gets very jealous.
3	"The Student Council President and the Photography Club's President"; Transliteration: "Seito kaichō to shashin-bu buchō" (Japanese: 生徒会長と写真部部長)	October 16, 2016
Hayato is shown a collection of naughty photos by a fellow classmate, after which Rin tries to confront the photography club, right as Ui and the other student council members are about to enter the club meeting room. Honoka, the photography club president, hints that she knows what happened at the summer festival between Hayato and Rin, while Ui (who was unaware of what exactly took place) immediately becomes suspicious. Later Ui manages to steal the memory card containing all the photos.
4	"The Disciplinary Committee Head's Awakening"; Transliteration: "Jajjimento-chō no kakusei (kari)" (Japanese: 風紀委員長の覚醒（仮）)	October 23, 2016
Hayato arrives at school and Rin talks about what happened at the summer festival to embarrass him. Ui is present, however, and thus finally learns what took place. Later, Ui and Karen leave the club room after Rin walked in asking for help, with Ui telling Rin to take Hayato instead. The two of them observe and end up tailing a couple into a secluded classroom, whereupon Rin is shocked but also aroused at the sight of the couple's sexual behavior. After Hayato snaps her out of her state, Rin interrupts the couple and orders them to stop.
5	"The Vice President's Long Night"; Transliteration: "Fuku kaichō no nagaiyo" (Japanese: 副会長の長い夜)	October 30, 2016
Ui has a fever, which Hayato discovers after touching her forehead. Hayato makes rice porridge and tries to feed Ui, which ends up creating a seemingly sexual situation. Later, Kei shows up with leftovers from Rin having made too much food, and Kei checks on Ui, finding that she has a cold instead of a fever. As Kei leaves, she gives Hayato medicine for Ui, but it turns out to be a suppository.
6	"A Dangerous Afternoon with Niikura-san"; Transliteration: "Nīkura-san to kiken'na hirusagari" (Japanese: 新倉さんと危険な昼下がり)	November 6, 2016
Hayato is at a department store with Ayane, as she tries some clothes after she asked Ui to "borrow" Hayato for a day. Although Ui approves it, she still spies on them nonetheless. Later on, Hayato and Ayane goes to a park and almost kissed, when Ui interrupted them while getting jealous from afar. Then Ayane had an idea to hold onto Hayato's arm and tells Ui to do the same with another, with the idea of sharing him.
7	"The Unrelenting Battle of the President and the Disciplinary Committee Head"; Transliteration: "Kaichō to jajjimento-chō no yuzurenai sen" (Japanese: 会長と風紀委員長の譲れない戦)	November 13, 2016
Kei is bathing and wanted Rin to join with her. She asks about Hayato and Ui, while Kei was told to keep it a secret. Rin leaves to confront Hayato and to find if there's any other secrets he's hiding. Ui interrupts them and wants to "test" something, in which Rin does too. Until Kei opens the door to tell Rin to make her food.
8	"The Presidents Efforts and Winters Temptations"; Transliteration: "Seito kaichō no ganbari to fuyu no yūwaku" (Japanese: 生徒会長の頑張りと冬の誘惑)	November 20, 2016
Ui tries to wake up Hayato and made breakfast. Then they study and Ui drops an eraser, as Hayato looks for it. He stops for awhile for a snack break and a tangerine for Ui. Rin interrupts Hayato from kissing Ui by bring food over. Then said that she and Kei moved next door in an apartment near them.
9	"The Photography Club President's Hidden Desire"; Transliteration: "Shashin-bu buchō no himeta yokubō" (Japanese: 写真部部長の秘めた欲望)	November 27, 2016
Hayato walks to school with Ui and Rin. As Ui wanted to hold Hayato's hand, Rin doesn't let it happen. When Honoka watches from afar. Then Hayato asks Honoka for help in something, and goes to the club room with a camera. Awhile everyone's in the room, she tries something with Hayato. And she told Rin to kiss Hayato, but pushes him away. Then Ui takes her place and Hayato runs away. Later Honoka sees him by the stairway.
10	"The President and Disciplinary Committee Heads Troubles"; Transliteration: "Seito kaichō to jajjimento-chō no tōron" (Japanese: 生徒会長と風紀委員長の懊悩)	December 4, 2016
At school Rin, Karin and Honoka talked to Kei, that Ui has good test scores. Then Kei told a story as Rin and Karin ran out of the room. When Honoka stayed behind and Ui was walking down the hallway, Rin asked her a question. Later they were buying something for Hayato; but really they were trying some new clothes.
11	"The Vice President and the Treasurer makes some kind of Progress"; Transliteration: "Fuku kaichō to kaikei no nanika no zenshin" (Japanese: 副会長と会計の何らかの前進)	December 11, 2016
Hayato was walking to school and saw Karin when he noticed her hair style changed. Not long after, Hayato then realises she even forgot to put her panties on. Hayato tries to help Karin, only for her to push him away. When both of them were walking in a corridor while doing a task, Honoka arrives. While Honoka was busy talking to Hayato, Karin walks past an open window, resulting in her skirt flipping up from the wind. At the same time, Honoka took a picture. In their eyes, Honoka seemed to have only taken a picture of Hayato. But in reality, Honoka managed to snap a picture of Karin's flipped skirt.
12	"A Holy Night with the President and All the Rest"; Transliteration: "Seito kaichō (+ a) to seinaru yoru o" (Japanese: 生徒会長(+α)と聖なる夜を)	December 18, 2016
Hayato, Ui and the others decided to have a Christmas Eve party at Hayato's apartment. Before Hayato tries to leave, Misato tells him that he qualifies to stay with the girls, due to his experience in crossdressing. Ui finds out about it and then crossdresses Hayato into a girl, thinking that it's something Hayato enjoys. Hayato then clears the misunderstanding. Honoka was the last to arrive at the party and takes a group picture of everyone.

== Reception ==
Chris Beveridge of The Fandom Post gave the first anime episode a B+ and said "I’ll admit that the concept is familiar and at the same time goofy, but there’s a certain quality about it that’s charming, sexy and has the potential to be a hell of a lot of fun." He give later episodes B's, writing that "the show does feel like it’s trying to be a bit educational though it tends to fall more on the whole titillation side more than anything else." In his review of episode 9, he wrote that "the show takes things further than reality would in a lot of ways, there’s a lot of fun in just having characters that actually acknowledge some form of sexuality that exists." and summarized the series as "Silly and serious but with a great dose of a fanservice, this show is just a delight to watch." In reviewing the final episode, he wrote "It does things that most shows are afraid to even think of, never mind even trying a fraction of doing when it comes to character relationships, intimacy, and sexuality."

== Notes and references ==
Notes

- "Ch." is shortened form for chapter and refers to a chapter number of the My Wife Is the Student Council President manga
- "Ep." is shortened form for episode and refers to an episode number of the My Wife Is the Student Council President anime

Japanese
