= Seven (animation studio) =

Japanese animation studio

Animation Studio Seven Co., Ltd.
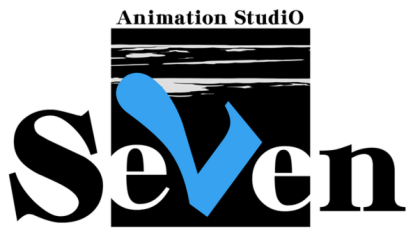
- Native name: 株式会社アニメーションスタジオ・セブン
- Romanized name: Kabushiki-gaisha Animēshonsutajio Sebun
- Type: Kabushiki-gaisha
- Industry: Hentai, Anime
- Predecessor: Radix Ace Entertainment
- Founded: September 2007; 19 years ago
- Founder: Taku Horie
- Headquarters: Kamiogi, Suginami, Tokyo, Japan
- Website: www.anist-seven.com

Animation Studio Seven Co., Ltd. (Japanese: 株式会社アニメーションスタジオ・セブン, Hepburn: Kabushiki-gaisha Animēshon Sutajio Sebun; stylized as Animation StudiO SeVen), known simply as Seven, is a Japanese animation studio that produces anime and hentai.

== Establishment ==
Seven was founded in September 2007 by ex-Wao World producer Taku Horie. After the bankruptcy of Radix Ace Entertainment in 2006, much of the staff wanted to continue pursuing jobs in the anime business, and after the founding of Seven, many of the Radix employees were enrolled into the company. The studio's first major production was an adult hentai OVA in 2011. In the same year, the studio produced its first televised series, a short-length TV adaptation of Morita-san wa Mukuchi. Although Seven animated numerous short television series and hentai series, it did not produce a full-length series until 2017 with the release of King's Game The Animation.

== Works ==
The list below is a list of Seven's works as a lead animation studio.

=== Hentai ===
Credited as Erotic Animation Studio Seven (Japanese: エロ・アニメーションスタジオ・セブン, Hepburn: Ero Animēshon Sutajio Sebun).

- Buta Hime-sama (2011)
- Hakoiri Shōjo: Virgin Territory (2011–2012)
- Rinkan Club (2011–2014)
- Otome dori (2012)
- Sei Yariman Gakuen Enkō Nikki The Animation (2013)
- Kagachi-sama Onagusame Tatematsurimasu: Netorare Mura Inya Hanashi (2013)
- Koikishi Purely☆Kiss The Animation (2013–2014)
- Shin Sei Yariman Gakuen Enkō Nikki The Animation (2014)
- Baku Ane: Otōto Shibocchau zo! The Animation (2014)
- Rance 01: Hikari wo Motomete The Animation (2014–2016)
- Buta no Gotoki Sanzoku ni Torawarete Shōjo o Ubawareru Kyonyū Himekishi & Onna Senshi: Zettai Chinpo Nanka ni Maketari Shinai!! The Animation (2015)
- Gyakuten Majo Saiban: Chijo na Majo ni Sabakarechau The Animation (2015)
- Nudist Beach ni Shūgakuryokō de!! The Animation (2016)
- Hachishaku Hachiwa Keraku Meguri: Igyō Kaikitan The Animation (2016–2017)
- Ero Zemi: Ecchi ni Yaru-ki ni ABC - The Animation (2017)
- Sōryo to Majiwaru Shikiyoku no Yoru ni... (2017)
- Yarimoku Beach ni Shūgakuryokō de!! The Animation (2017)
- Baku Ane 2: Otōto Ippai Shibocchau zo! The Animation (2017)
- Shikkoku no Shaga The Animation (2017–2019)
- Honoo no Haramase Oppai: Ero Appli Gakuen The Animation (2017–2018)
- Real Eroge Situation! The Animation (2018)
- Soikano: Gyutto Dakishimete The Animation (2018)
- Hatsujou Switch Otosareta Shoujo-tachi The Animation (2018)
- Wagaya no Liliana-san The Animation (2019)
- Seikatsu Shūkan The Animation (2019)
- Aikagi The Animation (2019)
- Aibeya The Animation (2019)
- Love x Holic: Miwaku no Otome to Hakudaku Kankei The Animation (2019)
- Tonari no Ie no Anette-san The Animation (2020)
- Suketto Sanjou!! The Animation (2020)
- Sekufure Osananajimi: Shojo to Doutei wa Hazukashii tte Minna ga Iu kara The Animation (2020)
- Inmou (2020–present)
- Succubus Stayed Life The Animation (2020–present)
- Iribitari Gal ni Manko Tsukawasete Morau Hanashi (2024)

=== Anime television series ===
Title	Director(s)	First run start date	First run end date	Eps	Note(s)	Ref.
Morita-san wa Mukuchi	Naotaka Hayashi	July 6, 2011	December 26, 2011	26	Adaptation of a manga by Tae Sano.	
Recorder to Randoseru Do♪	Hiroshi Kimura	January 5, 2012	March 28, 2012	13	Adaptation of a manga by Meme Higashiya.	
Recorder to Randoseru Re♪	Hiroshi Kimura	April 4, 2012	June 27, 2012	13	Sequel to Recorder to Randoseru Do♪.	
Ai Mai Mi	Itsuki Imazaki	January 3, 2013	March 28, 2013	13	Adaptation of a manga by Choborau Nyopomi.	
Recorder to Randoseru Mi♪	Hiroshi Kimura	July 8, 2013	September 23, 2013	12	Sequel to Recorder to Randoseru Re♪.	
Strange+	Takashi Nishikawa	January 9, 2014	March 27, 2014	12	Adaptation of a manga by Verno Mikawa.	
Inugami-san to Nekoyama-san	Shinpei Nagai	April 10, 2014	June 26, 2014	12	Adaptation of a manga by Kuzushiro.	
Ai Mai Mi: Mousou Catastrophe	Itsuki Imazaki	July 8, 2014	September 23, 2014	12	Sequel to Ai Mai Mi.	
Sin Strange+	Hiroyuki Furukawa	July 11, 2014	September 26, 2014	12	Sequel to Strange+.	
I Can't Understand What My Husband Is Saying	Shinpei Nagai	October 3, 2014	June 25, 2015	26	Adaptation of a manga by Coolkyousinnjya.	
My Wife is the Student Council President	Hiroyuki Furukawa	July 2, 2015	September 17, 2015	12	Adaptation of a manga by Yumi Nakata.	
Magical Somera-chan	Itsuki Imazaki	October 7, 2015	December 13, 2015	12	Adaptation of a manga by Choborau Nyopomi.	
My Wife is the Student Council President+	Hiroyuki Furukawa (Chief); Tokihiro Sasaki	October 2, 2016	December 18, 2016	12	Sequel to My Wife is the Student Council President.	
Ai Mai Mi 3: Surgical Friends	Itsuki Imazaki	January 3, 2017	March 21, 2017	12	Sequel to Ai Mai Mi: Mousou Catastrophe.	
On a Lustful Night Mingling with a Priest	Hideki Araki	April 2, 2017	June 18, 2017	12	Adaptation of a manga by Reon Maomi.	
Musekinin Galaxy Tylor	Hiroshi Kimura	July 11, 2017	September 26, 2017	12	Based on The Irresponsible Captain Tylor by Hitoshi Yoshioka.	
My Matchmaking Partner Is a Student, An Aggressive Troublemaker	Saburō Miura	October 2, 2017	December 18, 2017	12	Adaptation of a manga by Sigma Torai.	
King's Game The Animation	Tokihiro Sasaki	October 5, 2017	December 21, 2017	12	Adaptation of Nobuaki Kanazawa's cell phone novel Ōsama Game and Ōsama Game: Extreme.	
Holmes of Kyoto	Tokihiro Sasaki	July 9, 2018	September 24, 2018	12	Adaptation of a novel series by Mai Mochizuki.	
Joshi Kausei	Tokihiro Sasaki	April 6, 2019	June 22, 2019	12	Adaptation of a manga by Ken Wakai.	
Nobunaga Teacher's Young Bride	Tokihiro Sasaki	April 6, 2019	June 22, 2019	12	Adaptation of a manga by Azure Konno.	
Eternity: Shinya no Nurekoi Channel	Hideki Araki; Ryūichi Baba; Rokurō Kuramori; Iroha	October 5, 2020	December 21, 2020	12	Anthology adaptation of 12 novels and manga under the label Eternity Books published by AlphaPolis.	
Battle Athletes Victory ReSTART!	Tokihiro Sasaki	April 11, 2021	June 27, 2021	12	Adaptation of Rui Takato's manga "Pale Blue Dot : Battle Athletess Daiundōkai ReSTART!", sequel of Battle Athletes Victory.	
Peter Grill and the Philosopher's Time: Super Extra	Tatsumi	October 10, 2022	December 26, 2022	12	Sequel to Peter Grill and the Philosopher's Time. Co-production with Wolfsbane.	
High School! Kimengumi	Kazuaki Seki	January 9, 2026	March 27, 2026	12	Adaptation of a manga by Motoei Shinzawa.	
The Otome Heroine's Fight for Survival	Tokihiro Sasaki	July 2027	TBA	TBA	Adaptation of a light novel series by Harunohi Biyori. Co-production with Studio Clutch.	

=== Original video animations ===
Title	Director	Release date	Eps	Note(s)	Ref.
Recorder to Randoseru	Hiroshi Kimura	July 17, 2012	2	Bonus episodes featured in the DVD release of Recorder and Randsell Re♪.	
Paradise of Innocence	Takashi Nishikawa	August 28, 2015– August 29, 2016	2 (Episodes 2 and 3)	Adaptation of a manga by Uran.	
Sin Strange+	Takashi Nishikawa	October 19, 2014	1	Unaired episode released with the Sin Strange+ DVD.	
My Wife is the Student Council President	Hiroyuki Furukawa	January 27, 2016	1	Unaired episode bundled with the 9th volume of the manga.	

=== Films ===
Title	Director	Release date	Note(s)	Ref.
Marudase Kintarō	Hideki Araki	December 11, 2020	Adaptation of a yaoi manga by Naomi Guren.	
