= JManga =

American manga website

JManga Inc
- Company type: Private
- Website type: Digital Manga Portal
- Founded: December 2010
- Headquarters: San Francisco, California, United States
- Industry: Manga, digital comics
- Website: www.jmanga.com (defunct)
- Registration: Optional
- Current status: Discontinued

JManga was an American website and international online community focused on the promotion, distribution, and monetization of digital comics as well as the development of other manga-related services. Founded in December 2010 and backed by the 39 publishers of the Japanese Digital Comics Association, JManga was intended to serve as a legal alternative to scanlation sites and online piracy. The site was closed on May 30, 2013.

== Early history ==
JManga arose from a strategic alliance between Crunchyroll, Inc. (an internet company specializing in streaming East Asian media) and Bitway Co., Ltd (a subsidiary of Toppan Printing and digital comic distributor) in the summer of 2010 to create the world's first legal, global online manga platform. Originally, the project was envisioned as a way to explore mechanisms for economical, sustainable digitization of manga outside Japan, with the final product to be a white-label online platform for digitized manga (including manga viewer, social media integration, and a downloadable app for mobile devices) to be licensed to local publishers and distributors.

As originally conceived, local distributors would have a number of choices in how to use the JManga platform, with options ranging from simply using the viewer or app to licensing the entire Crunchyroll online publishing and management suite and rebranding it with their logos and graphics.

And where Crunchyroll worked as the technology partner to build the online tools for this venture, Bitway would act as liaison for the publishers of the Japanese Digital Comics Association and local publishers/distributors to help make previously unlicensed content available for those who desired more than their original content. Using its relationships with many of Japan's key publishers, Bitway would assist licensees of the Crunchyroll manga app in negotiating the rights to a digital license for desired titles - with an emphasis on publishers in the U.S. who had rights to the printed material, as manga licenses are unbundled and additional negotiations for the digital rights would be required for the same material.

At the time, the business model was simply to grow the digital manga industry, allowing existing businesses - and hopefuls with enough capital - to start up a digital manga distribution company, with the partnership taking a cut of the revenues for enabling easier and faster-paced development.

== Official launch ==
More details about the platform became available in July 2011, at San Diego Comic-Con, where a panel of Japanese manga editors spoke on the state of manga worldwide, noting while the numbers of fans had increased in the last decade (as measured by attendance at conventions such as Anime Expo), sales had drastically fallen, due to a number of reasons, among them piracy, lack of licensees, and the loss of the Borders. Since the project was first announced, the goal had changed from enabling would-be licensees to start up distribution companies, to simply offering a legal alternative to the numerous scanlation (unauthorized translated scans of Japanese manga) websites that have popped up in recent years.

The site became available in North America on August 17, 2011, receiving rather mixed reviews. Though it did launch with an interesting selection of titles that were unlikely to be licensed in English otherwise, with free access to selected works as well as an online store offering for-pay titles, and bonus content, such as interviews with manga creators, some found the available content (48 full-length works) disappointing when high prices were considered, along with seeming to fall short of plans to have 10,000 titles available by 2013. As well, the site's region-locking and lack of support for mobile devices was noted by many critics, with these changes from the original vision not well received.

Notably, however, the site has been responsive to criticism and suggestions posed via Twitter feed and Facebook pages, reassuring users that plans for mobile apps and global release were still on track, as well as lowering prices across the site from $8.99 to $4.99 in October 2011 in response to user complaints - a change made permanent in November.

JManga became accessible worldwide on February 28, 2012, following a social media campaign from users to remove region locking and make the contents of the site available to users around the world.

Changes to the payment model were rolled out on June 22, 2012, with JManga adding a "pay-as-you-go" plan and removing the distinction between JManga members and free members, allowing anyone to buy and use their points without a monthly subscription.

Further, on July 13, at their panel at San Diego Comic-Con in 2012, native iOS and Android applications were announced for release in October 2012, with the company also unveiling the "Manga Translation Battle", a contest open to amateur and professional alike, organized in collaboration with - and sponsored by - the Japanese Ministry of Cultural Affairs.

== Terminating service ==
On March 13, 2013, JManga announced that it was terminating both the JManga and JManga7 services. The JManga7 subscription service had already been discontinued. JManga stopped selling points and announced that existing points would no longer be redeemable.

== See also ==
- Weekly Shonen Jump Alpha, a digital shōnen manga anthology published in North America by Viz Media.
