= Zero Rise =

Japanese mixed-media project

- Genre: Sports (basketball)
- Created by: Bushiroad; Takaaki Kidani; Yoshiki Watabe
- Anime television series
- Studio: Nichicaline
- icon

Zero Rise (stylized in all caps) is a Japanese mixed-media project about basketball created by Bushiroad. A stage play ran from May 2–17, 2026, at the Hikōsen Theater in Tokyo. An anime television series produced by Nichicaline has been announced.

The project is set in "a hyper-competitive society, where the gap between rich and poor is widening," and people who have been "pushed aside" join ZERO RISE, an underground street basketball league.

== Characters ==
=== UNFIX ===
Madoka Kurogare
Voiced by: Hiroki Sasamori
Hagane Amadate (Date)
Voiced by: Fukui Tomoya
Tsukasa Marindo (Merlin)
Voiced by: Kai Ōtomo

=== KINGS+HOOT ===
Daiki Sugawara (Blink)
Voiced by: Hiroki Ishibashi
Kagetora Tamura (Miracle)
Voiced by: Takamichi Satō
Haruhi Niwa (Sunshine)
Voiced by: Yūsei Hiraga

=== RumbleWing[s] ===
Tsubasa Hirai (York)
Voiced by: Ren Tahara
Yuichiro Jinnai (Ujin)
Voiced by: Takumi Mano
Issa Jinnai (Sajin)
Voiced by: Yo Maejima

=== BLACKSPOT ===
Takeshi Hari (Ballista)
Voiced by: Shota Kawakami
UNKNOWN A
Voiced by: Shota Takiyama
UNKNOWN B
Voiced by: Yūshi
Hayato Jigen
Voiced by: Yūki Kimisawa

== Other media ==
=== Stage play ===
A stage play was announced at the "Cardfight!! Vanguard 15th Anniversary: Bushiroad New Year Announcements 2026" event on January 12, 2026. It ran at the Hikōsen Theater in Tokyo from May 2–17, 2026.

=== Anime ===
An anime television series was also announced at the same event on January 12, 2026. It will be produced by Nichicaline, with From Tokyo designing the characters.
