= Monochrome outfit =

Outfit using only variations of one color

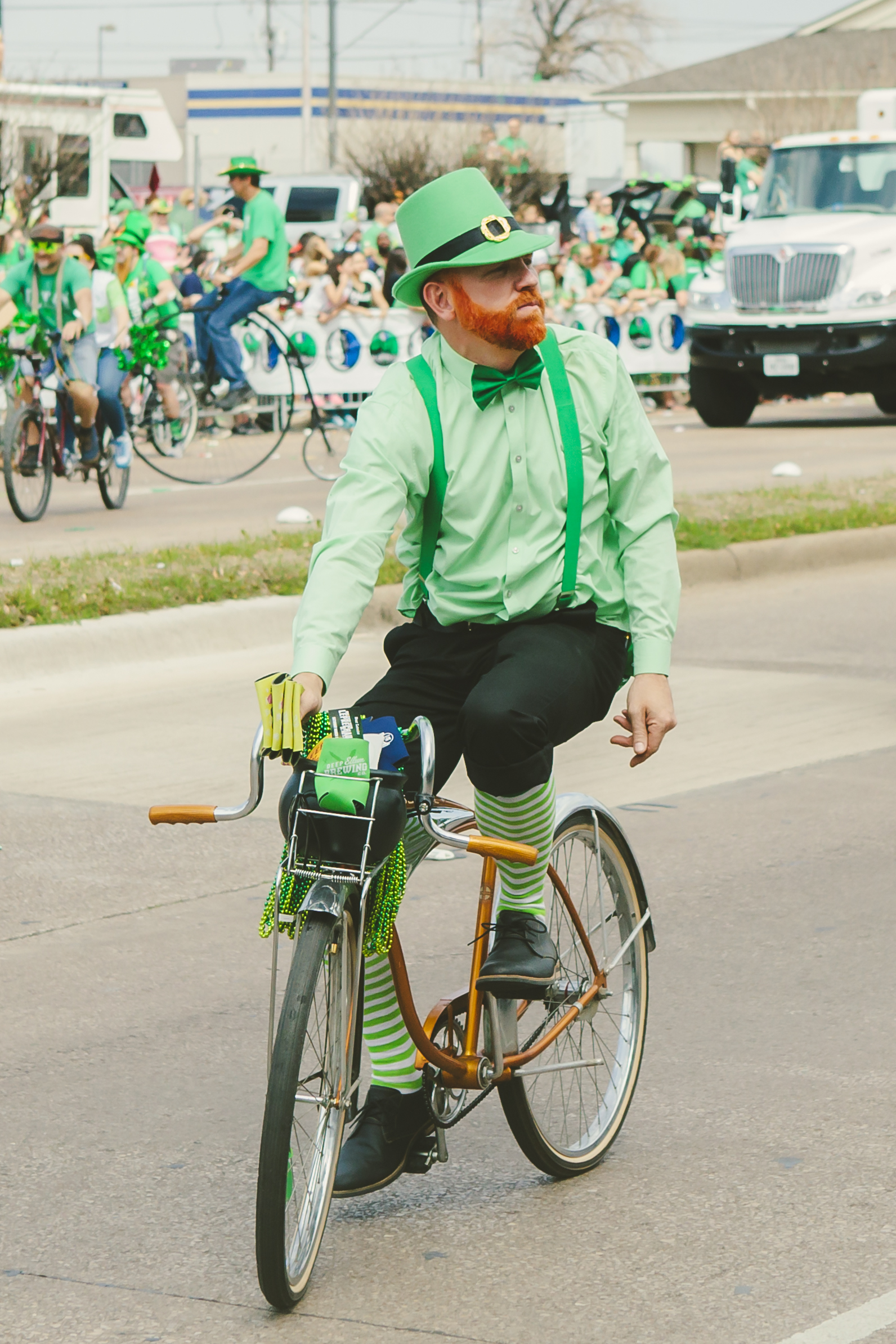
Man dressed in a monochrome Leprechaun outfit for St Patrick's Day, Dallas, 2018

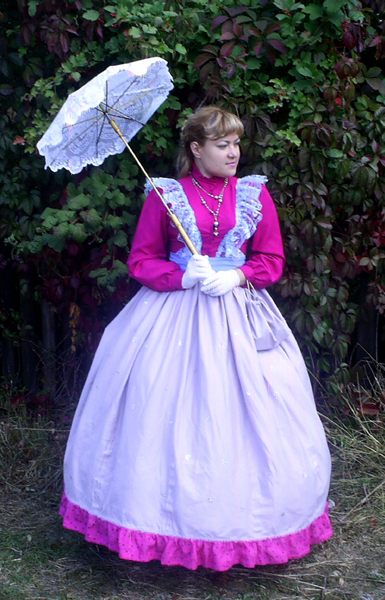
Woman in monochrome outfit, after Russian dress style from around 1850

A monochrome outfit is a full dress combination (usually including headwear, purse, footwears, and other accessories) that uses only variations of a single color, usually differing only in lightness and darkness.

The term may also mean a dress combination that uses only the colors black and white, for example as favored by fashion designer Coco Chanel.

== See also ==
- Miss Monochrome, an anime character and virtual singer that dresses in black and white.
