= Miss Kobayashi's Dragon Maid =

Japanese manga and its adaptations

- The cover of the first volume of the manga featuring Kobayashi (left) and Tohru (center)

小林さんちのメイドラゴン (Kobayashi-san Chi no Meidoragon)
- Genre: Fantasy comedy; Yuri; Slice of life
- Manga
- Written by: Coolkyousinnjya
- Published by: Futabasha
- English publisher: NA: Seven Seas Entertainment
- Imprint: Action Comics
- Magazine: Monthly Action (2013–2024); Manga Action (2024–present)
- Original run: 25 May 2013 – present
- Volumes: 20
Further information
Manga
Miss Kobayashi's Dragon Maid: Kanna's Daily Life
Written by	Mitsuhiro Kimura
Published by	Futabasha
English publisher	NA: Seven Seas Entertainment
Imprint	Action Comics
Magazine	Monthly Action (2016–2024); Web Action (2024–present)
Original run	24 December 2016 – present
Volumes	16
Anime television series
Directed by	Yasuhiro Takemoto
Produced by	Mikio Uetsuki; Risa Sakai; Shigeru Saitō; Shinichi Nakamura
Written by	Yuka Yamada
Music by	Masumi Itō
Studio	Kyoto Animation
Licensed by	Crunchyroll (streaming); SEA: Plus Media Networks Asia
Original network	Tokyo MX, TVA, ABC, BS11
English network	SEA: Aniplus Asia
Original run	12 January 2017 – 6 April 2017
Episodes	13 + OVA
Manga
Miss Kobayashi's Dragon Maid: Elma's Office Lady Diary
Written by	Ayami Kazama
Published by	Futabasha
English publisher	NA: Seven Seas Entertainment
Imprint	Action Comics
Magazine	Monthly Action (2017–2024); Web Action (2024–present)
Original run	25 August 2017 – present
Volumes	12
Manga
Miss Kobayashi's Dragon Maid: Lucoa is my xx
Written by	Utamaro
Published by	Futabasha
Magazine	Monthly Action (2019–2024); Web Action (2024–present)
Original run	25 January 2019 – present
Volumes	10
Manga
Miss Kobayashi's Dragon Maid: Fafnir the Recluse
Written by	Nobuyoshi Zamurai
Published by	Futabasha
English publisher	NA: Seven Seas Entertainment
Imprint	Action Comics
Magazine	Monthly Action (2020–2024); Web Action (2024–present)
Original run	25 November 2020 – present
Volumes	7
Anime television series
Miss Kobayashi's Dragon Maid S
Directed by	Tatsuya Ishihara; Yasuhiro Takemoto (Note: Posthumous work; Series Director (シリーズ監督))
Written by	Yuka Yamada
Music by	Masumi Itō
Studio	Kyoto Animation
Licensed by	Crunchyroll: SEA: Bilibili
Original network	ABC, Tokyo MX, TVA, BS11
Original run	8 July 2021 – 23 September 2021
Episodes	12 + OVA
Manga
Miss Kobayashi's Dragon Maid: Ilulu Doesn't Understand Love
Written by	Kometsubu
Published by	Futabasha
English publisher	NA: Seven Seas Entertainment
Imprint	Action Comics
Magazine	Web Action
Original run	12 November 2024 – present
Volumes	2
Video game
Miss Kobayashi's Dragon Maid: Burst Forth!! Choro-gon Breath (2022)
Film
Miss Kobayashi's Dragon Maid: A Lonely Dragon Wants to Be Loved (2025)
- icon

Miss Kobayashi's Dragon Maid (Japanese: 小林さんちのメイドラゴン, Hepburn: Kobayashi-san Chi no Meidoragon), also known as The Maid Dragon of Kobayashi-san (Note: This title is seen on the cover of the Japanese version of the manga.) is a Japanese manga series written and illustrated by Coolkyousinnjya. The series began serialization in Futabasha's Monthly Action magazine in May 2013; it was transferred to Manga Action in 2024 after Monthly Action ended. Four spin-off manga had also been serialized in Monthly Action and were transferred to Web Action. A fifth spin-off manga started in Web Action. The series is set in Oborozuka, modeled after Koshigaya, Saitama Prefecture, and follows a female office worker who discovered a young dragon who has the ability to transform into a humanoid girl and was hired as her maid living in an apartment.

An anime television series adaptation produced by Kyoto Animation aired in Japan between January and April 2017. A second season titled Miss Kobayashi's Dragon Maid S aired between July and September 2021. A video game titled Miss Kobayashi's Dragon Maid: Burst Forth!! Choro-gon Breath was released in Japan in March 2022 and in North America in August 2022. An anime film titled Miss Kobayashi's Dragon Maid: A Lonely Dragon Wants to Be Loved premiered on 27 June 2025.

== Plot ==
As office worker and programmer Kobayashi gets ready for work, she is greeted by a large dragon right outside her front door. The dragon immediately transforms into a humanoid girl in a maid outfit and introduces herself as Tohru. It turns out, that during a drunken excursion into the mountains the night before, Kobayashi had encountered the dragon, who claimed to have come from another world. Subsequently, Kobayashi removed a holy sword from Tohru's back, earning her gratitude. With Tohru having no place to stay, Kobayashi offers to let the dragon stay at her home and become her personal maid, to which she agrees, having fallen in love with Kobayashi.

Despite being efficient at housework, Tohru proves an unorthodox character, occasionally scaring Kobayashi and often bringing more trouble to Kobayashi's life than help. Additionally, Tohru's presence alone attracts other dragons, gods, and mythical beings to her new home. One of these dragons, Kanna, shows up at Kobayashi's door, demanding that Kobayashi return Tohru to the other world. It is then revealed that she'd been exiled from the other world, and having nowhere else to stay, Kobayashi takes her in and becomes her guardian. As both Tohru and Kanna settle into the human world, Kobayashi starts to think of them as family.

== Characters ==
=== Main ===
Kobayashi (小林)
Voiced by: Mutsumi Tamura (Japanese); Leah Clark (English)
A 25-year-old normal programmer and office worker who suddenly finds herself living with a dragon named Tohru after removing a divine sword from her on a drunken night. While typically stoic and kind-hearted, she can get wild when drunk. She will usually get hangovers resulting in the cast having to wait on her hand and foot. She has a particular fascination with maids. She is occasionally mistaken as a boy due to her lack of feminine features—particularly her flat chest—and apparent lack of sexuality.
Tohru (トール, Tōru) (Note: Written as Thor at the link address of anime version's official website characters page, although it is implied by Tohru and others that the name is a reference to J.R.R Tolkien, written Tōru-kin (トールキン))
Voiced by: Yūki Kuwahara (Japanese); Sarah Wiedenheft (English)
A female dragon of the Chaos faction who comes from another world called the dragon realm and is capable of using magic to perform such tasks as "perception-blocking" (which causes people to simply overlook her), repairing damage she may have caused, or transforming between a dragon and a human. After her life is saved by Kobayashi, she falls in love with her and starts living in her flat as a maid. She usually retains her horns when changing into human shape, and occasionally retains her tail and wings. She is commonly mistaken for a cosplayer due to her appearance. A running gag involves her attempting to feed Kobayashi pieces of her tail (which she can regenerate) with her cooking as a sign of affection and a sign of love. Initially, Kobayashi doesn't reciprocate Tohru's feelings and only sees her as nothing more than her personal maid. However, in chapter 97 of the manga, she finally confesses her feelings to Kobayashi and they become a couple.
Kanna Kamui (カンナカムイ) (Note: Also spelled as Canna Kamuy. Her first name is written as Canna at the link address of Anime version's official website characters page, while her last name is referred to Kamuy.)
Voiced by: Maria Naganawa (Japanese); Jad Saxton (English)
Tohru's friend from the dragon realm who was exiled from her world for pulling one too many pranks on other dragons and wound up living with Kobayashi as well; she initially assumes that Kobayashi seduced Tohru into staying and wanted the latter to return to their original world, but then grows increasingly attached to Kobayashi as the series progresses, viewing her as a mother figure. Though Kanna has yet to align with a dragon faction, Kanna is highly regarded due to bearing the name "Kamui"; her basis and attire are inspired by the culture of the indigenous natives of Hokkaido, and she herself claims to be from Ushishir. Although she is much older than she appears, she is very young by dragon standards, equivalent to a primary school student at Oborozuka Elementary School (朧ズカ 小学校, Oborozuka Shōgakkō), which she attends as a third grade student bearing Kobayashi's surname. She bears feather-like horns and a thin tail ending in a bulb, and is capable of recharging her depleted magical energy with electricity. She is the crush of Riko Saikawa, which she reciprocates whereupon the two state they want to marry each other.

=== Dragons ===
Elma (エルマ, Eruma)
Voiced by: Yūki Takada (Japanese); Rachel Glass (English)
A water dragon belonging to the Order faction, rival to Tohru's Chaos faction, who ends up working alongside Kobayashi at her office after getting stuck in the human world. She is as powerful as she is diligent and driven, but also naive, indecisive, and with a ravenous appetite; she will often go broke (in part due to her low income) and is easily swayed by food, primarily if it is sweet. Her human form is distinguished by purple hair, a horn (which she hides for work), her habit of having a jacket or kimono hanging off her shoulder, and wielding a trident; Elma Joui (上井 エルマ, Jōi Eruma) is the identity she uses while in Kobayashi's workplace. Several chapters of the manga focus on her having had an old friendship with Tohru which was broken due to their alignments, with chapter 96 revealing that she has feelings for Tohru that she confesses to Tohru, despite being expectedly spurned.
Lucoa (ルコア, Rukoa) (Note: Written as Lecore at the link address of Anime version's official website characters page.)
Voiced by: Minami Takahashi (Japanese); Jamie Marchi (English)
A female adaptation of her namesake, Quetzalcoatl (ケツァルコアトル, Ketsarukoatoru)—often referred to as Lucoa (from "Quetzalcoatl" as adapted to the Japanese syllabary)—is another friend of Tohru who is aligned with neither faction, having lost her divine status centuries ago after getting drunk and causing a scandal involving her younger sister; Tohru will sometimes casually reference this much to Lucoa's embarrassment. Lucoa appears in her human form as a tall, well-endowed woman with striking heterochromia. Tohru sees her as a source of wisdom, but Lucoa's discomfort with clothes—which she tolerates should she be required to be dressed—often leaves her preferring to wear tight-fitting clothing that shows a lot of skin; a running gag involves others criticizing her for this, marking her as a pervert, or—should they be a staff member of a public place—dragging her away should her attire be inappropriate. Most notably, she lives with Shouta after she interrupted his demon-summoning spell to prevent him from summoning a dangerous demon, causing him to mistakenly believe she is a succubus; and in her attempts to warm him up to her, she often becomes overly affectionate with Shouta, scaring him.
Fafnir (ファフニール, Fafunīru)
Voiced by: Daisuke Ono (Japanese); Garret Storms (English)
Another adaptation of his namesake and old friend of Tohru. He is a male Chaos faction dragon with a cold demeanour, disdainful mentality, and strong distrust for humans. He appears as a refined young man with long black hair and red eyes in his human form. After he decides to stay on earth, Tohru attempts to find him a place to do so (under the name Takeshi Ooyama (大山 猛, Ōyama Takeshi)); Fafnir eventually comes to live with Takiya, becoming obsessed with video games and popular culture.
Ilulu (イルル, Iruru)
Voiced by: Tomomi Mineuchi (TV series), Shiori Sugiura (film) (Japanese); Kristi Rothrock (English)
A Chaos faction dragon who targets Tohru because of her relationship with a human, attempting to destroy the city in the process. She then turns her eye to Kobayashi, trying to drive her and Tohru apart to prove her beliefs; but after Kobayashi and Tohru save her from an Order dragon, she has a change of heart and ends up living with them. Ilulu appears in her human form as a petite girl with a very ample bust. Her mental growth was somewhat impaired due to various beliefs that were forced on her by other chaos dragons. When she was younger, she enjoyed playing with human children; and since coming to Earth, she has taken up a job at a candy store, so that she can still see children when they are happy. During the series she also enjoys teasing a highschooler and grandson of the owner of the candy shop named Taketo Aida with her shameless antics as well his company, who starts having romantic feelings for her.
Damocles (ダモクレス, Damokuresu)
Voiced by: Takayuki Sugō (Japanese); John McCalmont (English)
Tohru's father, also called as "The Emperor of Demise" (終焉帝, Shūentei) by other dragons. He disapproves of Tohru's relationship with Kobayashi due to their beliefs as Chaos dragons and because of a non-interference rule about Earth. He attempts to force Tohru to leave with him but decides to let her stay after Kobayashi stands up to him, despite knowing how easily he could kill her. He still leaves Kobayashi alive, as he does not want to risk angering Tohru, who he recognizes as stronger than him.

=== Humans ===
Makoto Takiya (滝谷 真, Takiya Makoto)
Voiced by: Yuichi Nakamura (Japanese); Jeff Johnson (English)
Kobayashi's co-worker who is initially believed by Tohru to be a rival for Kobayashi's affections, but is really just an otaku who thinks of Kobayashi as "one of the guys" and likes to talk about maids with her. Kobayashi helps him set up during Comiket every year. Fafnir eventually decides to live with him in the human world due to his enormous game and manga collection.
Riko Saikawa (才川 リコ, Saikawa Riko)
Voiced by: Emiri Katō (Japanese); Sara Ragsdale (English)
Kanna's primary school classmate who can be haughty towards her other classmates. Should someone strike her as cute, she will be overwhelmed with affection towards that person; she is thus initially hostile towards Kanna but soon develops a crush on her, with a running gag involving her being flushed with bliss for most of her time around Kanna. Kanna reciprocates her feelings, and the two state they want to marry each other.
Sanae Saikawa (才川 苗, Saikawa Sanae) / Georgie (ジョージー, Jōjī) (Note: Written as Jorge at the link address of Anime version's official website characters page.)
Voiced by: Yūko Gotō (Japanese); Felecia Angelle (English)
Riko's older sister who pretends to be a housemaid as her hobby and thus gets on very well with Kobayashi. She so deeply identifies as "Georgie" that she seems to have forgotten her real name, which was later revealed as "Sanae".
Shouta Magatsuchi (真ヶ土 翔太, Magatsuchi Shōta)
Voiced by: Kaori Ishihara (Japanese); Alison Viktorin (season 1), Macy Anne Johnson (season 2) (English)
A young mage who Lucoa starts living with after she interrupted his demon-summoning spell. He is thus convinced that Lucoa is a succubus, and though she tries to clear the misunderstanding, her overly familiar antics do little to help her case. A running gag involves him blushing and running away every time he gets caught up in such antics and scolding her as a "demon". In the anime, he is in fifth grade at the school Riko and Kanna attend. His father is the director of Kobayashi's company, who designed their programming language based on magic from the other world, and keeps tabs on Tohru and Kobayashi for the Emperor of Demise.
Taketo Aida (会田 タケト, Aida Taketo)
Voiced by: Hiro Shimono (Japanese); Jordan Dash Cruz (English)
Taketo is a highschooler and grandson of the owner of the candy shop where Ilulu works. Embarrassed at first with her lack of common sense and voluptuous body, Taketo eventually grows close with Ilulu, who starts having romantic feelings for him.
Tsubaki Aida (会田 ツバキ, Aida Tsubaki)

Voiced by: Tomoko Naka (Japanese); Wendy Powell (English)

Tsubaki is the grandmother of Taketo and a candy store owner who ends up hiring Ilulu as a part-time worker after suffering a nasty fall while jogging. She had planned to relinquish her duties as a shopkeeper to her grandson Taketo Aida upon her retirement, but she knew that Taketo was unwilling to work there long-term, as well knewing that closing her shop down will upset the children. When Ilulu asks Tsubaki for a job, she kindly accepts letting her to filled the role as the shopkeeper while she's retiring and healing.

== Media ==
=== Manga ===
Coolkyousinnjya began publishing the series in the first issue of Futabasha's Monthly Action magazine on 25 May 2013. In 2024 it was transferred to Manga Action after Monthly Action ended publication. Seven Seas Entertainment licensed the series in North America, and they released the first volume in October 2016.

A spin-off manga illustrated by Mitsuhiro Kimura, titled Miss Kobayashi's Dragon Maid: Kanna's Daily Life (小林さんちのメイドラゴン カンナの日常, Kobayashi-san Chi no Meidoragon: Kanna no Nichijō), began serialization in Monthly Action on 24 December 2016. Seven Seas Entertainment also licensed the spin-off in North America.

A second spin-off drawn by Ayami Kazama, titled Miss Kobayashi's Dragon Maid: Elma's Office Lady Diary (小林さんちのメイドラゴン エルマのOL日記, Kobayashi-san Chi no Meidoragon: Elma OL Nikki), began serialization in Monthly Action on 25 August 2017. The second spin-off is also licensed by Seven Seas.

A third manga spin-off drawn by Utamaro, titled Miss Kobayashi's Dragon Maid: Lucoa is my xx (小林さんちのメイドラゴン ルコアは僕の××です。, Kobayashi-san-chi no Meidoragon: Lucoa wa Boku no xx Desu.), began serialization in Monthly Action on 25 January 2019.

A fourth spin-off series drawn by Nobuyoshi Zamurai, titled Miss Kobayashi's Dragon Maid: Fafnir the Recluse (小林さんちのメイドラゴン お篭りぐらしのファフニール, Kobayashi-san Chi no Meidoragon: Okomori Gurashi no Fafnir) began serialization in Monthly Action on 25 November 2020. The fourth spin-off is also licensed by Seven Seas.

The spin-offs were transferred to Web Action after Monthly Action ended publication.

A fifth spin-off series drawn by Kometsubu, titled Miss Kobayashi's Dragon Maid: Ilulu Doesn't Understand Love (小林さんちのメイドラゴン イルルは恋とかわかりません!, Kobayashi-san Chi no Meidoragon: Iruru wa Koi toka Wakarimasen!) began serialization in Web Action on 12 November 2024. The fifth spin-off is also licensed by Seven Seas.

=== Anime ===
On 18 April 2016, the wraparound cover of the fourth volume of the series revealed that an anime television series adaptation had been greenlit. The series was directed by Yasuhiro Takemoto at Kyoto Animation and aired in Japan between 12 January and 6 April 2017. Yuka Yamada handled series composition, Miku Kadowaki designed the characters, Nobuaki Maruki served as chief animation director, and the music was composed by Masumi Itō. An original video animation episode was released on the seventh Blu-ray/DVD compilation volume on 20 September 2017. The opening theme is "Aozora no Rhapsody" (青空のラプソディ; "Rhapsody of Blue Sky") by Fhána, and the ending theme is "Ishukan Communication" (イシュカン・コミュニケーション; "Interspecies Communication") by Chorogons (Tohru (Yūki Kuwahara), Kanna Kamui (Maria Naganawa), Lucoa (Minami Takahashi), and Elma (Yūki Takada)).

A second season was announced with the release of the eighth manga volume on 12 February 2019. Its status was unknown for a time following the death of Takemoto in the Kyoto Animation arson attack. Titled Miss Kobayashi's Dragon Maid S (小林さんちのメイドラゴンS, Kobayashi-san Chi no Meidoragon S), the season aired between 8 July and 23 September 2021. Kyoto Animation returned to produce the season. Tatsuya Ishihara replaced Takemoto as director, although Takemoto is credited as "series director" under Ishihara. Yuka Yamada returned to supervise the series' scripts, Masumi Itō returned as music composer, and Miku Kadowaki and Nobuaki Maruki returned as character designer and chief animation director, respectively. The cast members also returned to reprise their roles. An original video animation was released with the special "Volume S" Blu-ray/DVD volume on 19 January 2022. The opening theme is "Ai no Supreme!" (愛のシュプリーム！, Ai no Shupurīmu!) by Fhána, and the ending theme for the first 11 episodes is "Maid With Dragons" by Super Chorogons (Tohru (Kuwahara), Kanna Kamui (Naganawa), Lucoa (Takahashi), Elma (Takada), and Ilulu (Tomomi Mineuchi)). In the season finale, "Aozora no Rhapsody" plays as the supreme ending theme, with the song also making a short appearance in episode 3 as an insert song.

An anime film titled Miss Kobayashi's Dragon Maid: A Lonely Dragon Wants to Be Loved (Japanese: 小林さんちのメイドラゴン さみしがりやの竜, Hepburn: Kobayashi-san Chi no Meidoragon: Samishigariya no Ryū) was announced on 21 September 2024, with Ishihara returning as director. It premiered in Japanese theaters on 27 June 2025, with a 105-minute runtime. The film's opening theme song is "Namida no Parade" (涙のパレード, Namida no Parēdo) by Fhána and the ending theme song is "Bokutachi no Hibi" (僕たちの日々, Bokutachi no Hibi) by Sachiko Kobayashi.

==== English release and international distribution ====
Crunchyroll simulcasted the series outside of Asia as it aired while Funimation released an English dubbed version from 1 February 2017.

The first season of the series was released on Blu-ray and DVD in North America on 24 April 2018 while Madman Entertainment released the series in Australia and New Zealand. The second season was also released on home video in North America on 8 November 2022.

Plus Media Networks Asia licensed the first season in Southeast Asia and simulcasted it on Aniplus Asia. Bilibili licensed the second season in Southeast Asia.

=== Video game ===
On 23 September 2021, Bushiroad announced that Kaminari Games would be developing a shoot 'em up video game based on the series. Titled Miss Kobayashi's Dragon Maid: Burst Forth!! Choro-gon Breath, it was released on 24 March 2022 on Nintendo Switch and PlayStation 4 in Japan, followed by a worldwide launch by Aksys Games on the same consoles on 25 August 2022. A Director's Cut version was released on Steam on 27 October 2022.
