= Wooser's Hand-to-Mouth Life =

Japanese short anime by Sanzigen

- Title screen

うーさーのその日暮らし (Ūsā no Sono-hi-gurashi)
- Created by: Yoshiki Usa
- Anime television series
- Directed by: Toyonori Yamada
- Written by: Kazuyuki Fudeyasu
- Music by: Daisuke Sakabe; Makoto Watanabe
- Studio: Sanzigen
- Licensed by: Crunchyroll
- Original network: TV Tokyo, Niconico Channel, AT-X
- Original run: October 3, 2012 – December 19, 2012
- Episodes: 12
- Anime television series

Wooser's Hand-to-Mouth Life: Kakusei-hen
- Directed by: Kenji Seto
- Written by: Yoshiki Usa; Yoshiko Nakamura
- Music by: Daisuke Sakabe; Makoto Watanabe
- Studio: Sanzigen; Liden Films
- Licensed by: Crunchyroll
- Original network: TV Tokyo, Niconico Channel, AT-X
- Original run: January 7, 2014 – March 25, 2014
- Episodes: 12
- Anime television series

Wooser's Hand-to-Mouth Life: Mugen-hen
- Directed by: Seiji Mizushima
- Written by: Yoshiki Usa
- Music by: Daisuke Sakabe; Makoto Watanabe
- Studio: Sanzigen
- Original run: July 3, 2015 – September 25, 2015
- Episodes: 13

Wooser's Hand-to-Mouth Life (うーさーのその日暮らし, Ūsā no Sono-hi-gurashi) is a Japanese short CG anime series by Sanzigen, based on a short journal column created by Supercell member Yoshiki Usa and illustrator Tomoko Fujinoki. The series aired on TV Tokyo between October and December 2012, and was streamed on Nico Nico Douga and Crunchyroll. A second season began airing in January 2014 and ended on March 25, 2014. A third season began airing on July 3, 2015, and ended on September 25, 2015.

== Characters ==
Wooser (うーさー, Ūsā)
Voiced by: Mamoru Miyano
A mysterious yellow rabbit-like animal who lives on the internet. He has three dots on his face, representing his eyes (outer two dots) and nose (center dot). He loves money, meat, girls and girls' school uniforms, and hides this corrupt personality with his cute appearance.
Rin (りん)
Voiced by: Minori Ozawa
A sensible brown-haired girl whose house Wooser likes to freeload in.
Len (れん, Ren)
Voiced by: Haruka Nagamune
Rin's precocious twin sister who has black hair.
Darth Wooser (ダスウサ, Dasu Usa)
Voiced by: Hiroshi Kamiya
A mysterious black robot that Wooser made resembling himself.
Yuu (ゆう, Yū)
Voiced by: Tia
One of Rin and Len's classmates who wears twintails and a flower.
"The animal whose name must not be spoken" (名前を呼んではいけないあの動物, Namae o Yonde wa Ikenai Ano Dōbutsu)
Voiced by: Junichi Suwabe
A white owl-like animal who is often seen with Yuu.
Miho (みほ)
Voiced by: Yuri Sato
Another one of Rin and Len's classmates.
Ajipon (あじぽん)
Voiced by: Nana Mizuki
A raccoon who is often seen with Miho.

== Anime ==
The first series aired in Japan between October 3 and December 19, 2012. Crunchyroll began streaming the series from December 11, 2012. The ending theme is "Love Me Gimme" (ラブミーギミー, Rabu Mī Gimī) by Tia. The series was released on Blu-ray Disc and DVD on March 22, 2013, with an original video animation episode included on the BD release.

A second season, titled Wooser's Hand-to-Mouth Life: Awakening Arc (うーさーのその日暮らし 覚醒編, Ūsā no Sono-hi-gurashi: Kakusei-hen), began airing from January 7, 2014, to March 25, 2014. A third season began airing from July 3, 2015, to September 25, 2015 (with each episode at almost eight minutes as opposed to the original four).

=== Season 1 ===
No.	Title	Original release date
1	"Meat and Pandas and Wooser" "Niku to Panda to Ūsā to" (肉とパンダとうーさーと)	October 3, 2012
Wooser hangs around in a zoo before visiting a farm.
2	"Star and Rock and Wooser" "Hoshi to Rokku to Ūsā to" (星とロックとうーさーと)	October 10, 2012
Rin and her friends start an all-bass rock band whilst Wooser is killed and has an uneventful funeral.
3	"Wealth and Authority and Wooser" "Tomi to Ken'i to Ūsā to" (富と権威とうーさーと)	October 17, 2012
Wooser spends a day as king before lazing around the house.
4	"Moe and Rap and Wooser" "Moe to Chekera to Ūsā to" (萌とチェケラとうーさーと)	October 24, 2012
Wooser has breakfast, starts his own rap group and does some pottery.
5	"Bears and Gourmet and Wooser" "Kuma to Gurume to Ūsā to" (熊とグルメとうーさーと)	October 31, 2012
Wooser has curious dreams whilst Rin and the others graduate from high school.
6	"The Sea and Swimsuits and Wooser" "Umi to Mizugi to Ūsā to" (海と水着とうーさーと)	November 7, 2012
Rin and Len have fun at the beach whilst Wooser ogles their swimsuit bodies.
7	"Forests and Baths and Wooser" "Mori to Ofuro to Ūsā to" (森とお風呂とうーさーと)	November 14, 2012
Wooser acts like a cicada and imagines being hunted by a lion.
8	"Boredom and Machines and Wooser" "Hima to Mashin to Ūsā to" (暇とマシンとうーさーと)	November 21, 2012
Wooser wastes his entire weekend and goes about destroying the city, forcing Rin and Len to fight against him in a giant robot.
9	"Bugs and Masks and Wooser" "Mushi to Kamen to Ūsā to" (虫と仮面とうーさーと)	November 28, 2012
Wooser has a barbecue, fills out his planner and starts his own secret society.
10	"Money and Magic and Wooser" "Kane to Mahō to Ūsā to" (金と魔法とうーさーと)	December 5, 2012
Rin and Len become magical girls to fight against a giant Mecha-Wooser.
11	"Ghosts, Opera and Wooser" "Rei to Opera to Ūsā to" (霊とオペラとうーさーと)	December 12, 2012
The cute detective girls from Milky Holmes pay Wooser a cameo visit.
12	"Love, Farewell and Wooser" "Ai to Wakare to Ūsā to" (愛と別れとうーさーと)	December 19, 2012
Wooser and his friends have fun at the skating rink before marking the end of the first season.

=== Season 2 ===
No.	Title	Original release date
1	"The Beginning - The Scenery of a Certain Day, The Girls' Daily Lives, The Return of Wooser -" "Shidō 〜to Aru Hi no Fūkei, Shojō-tachi no Nichijō, Kattekita Ūsā〜" (始動 〜とある日の風景、少女たちの日常、帰ってきたうーさー〜)	January 7, 2014
2	"JUSTICE -A Lonely Battle, A Sworn Victory for Mother, Wooser Goes for the Draw~" "Seigi 〜Kodokunaru Tatakai, Haha ni Chikau Shōri, Hiawake Netai No Ūsā〜" (正義 〜孤独なる戦い、母に誓う勝利、引き分け狙いのうーさー〜)	January 14, 2014
3	"~Memories Faded, Memories Unfading, The Cutest Wooser in the World~" "Ōtoku 〜Iroseta Kiroku, Iroaseny Kioku, Sekaiichi Kawaī Ūsā〜" (王国 〜色あせた記録、色褪せぬ記憶、世界一かわいいうーさー〜)	January 21, 2014
4	"Evolution ~Fragments of Ephemeral Dreams, Guidance of Shining Stars, Wooser Going His Own Way~" "Shinka 〜Hakanaki Yume no Kakera, Kiramiku Hoshi no Michibiki, Wagamichi o Iku Ūsā 〜" (進化 〜儚き夢の欠片、きらめく星の導き、我が道を行くうーさー〜)	January 28, 2014
5	"Promise: ~A Passion for Uniforms, A Family Restaurant is Fine, Burning Wooser~" "Yakusoku 〜Seifuku ni Kakeru Jōnetsu, Famiresu Demo Ī, Moe Tagiru Ūsā〜" (約束 〜制服にかける情熱、ファミレスでもいい、燃え滾るうーさー〜)	February 4, 2014
6	"Trust: ~Midsummer Night Illusion, Mechanical Comrade, Wooser Doesn't Have Many Friends~" "Shinrai 〜Manatsu no Yoru no Mabrosohi, Kikai Shikake no Sennyū, Tomodachi ga Sukunai Ūsā〜" (信頼 〜真夏の夜の幻、機械仕掛けの戦友、友達が少ないうーさー〜)	February 11, 2014
7	"Inevitability ~The World Changes. The Future Lies Ahead. Wooser Refuses to Move Forward~" "Hitsuzen" (必然 〜変わりゆく世界、その先にある未来、進む気がないうーさー〜)	February 18, 2014
8	"Cheers ~A Time for Blessings, Keep Common Sense in Mind, Because Wooser Won't~" "Kassai 〜Shukufuku no Toki, Wakimetai Jōshiki, Wakmaenai Ūsā〜" (喝采 〜祝福の時、わきまえたい常識、わきまえないうーさー〜)	February 25, 2014
9	"Recollections ~The Real You, the Truth You Must Confront, Wooser Turns Away" "Tsuioku 〜Hontō no Jibun, Mukiaubeki Shinjiysu, Me o Sorasu Ūsā〜" (追憶 〜本当の自分、向かい合うべき真実、目を逸らすうーさー〜)	March 4, 2014
10	"Fate ~The Strongest Enemy Appears; A Cruel, Inescapable Destiny; Wooser is Judged~" "Inga 〜Arawareta Saikyō no Teki, Aragaenu Kakokuna Unmei, Saba Reru Ūsā〜" (因果 〜現れた最強の敵、抗えぬ過酷な運命、裁かれるうーさー〜)	March 11, 2014
11	"Hope ~Lalalalalalalalalaalalalaa, lalalalalalalalalaalalalaa~" "Kibō 〜Rarararararararararārararā, Rarararararararararārararā〜" (希望 〜ラララララララララーラララー、ラララララララララーラララー〜)	March 18, 2014
12	"Awakening ~Love Drawn in Starry Skies, Your Present is Me, Thank You, Wooser~" "Kakusei 〜Hoshizora ni Kaku Ai, Purezento ha Ore da, Arigatō Ūsā〜" (覚醒 〜星空に描く愛、プレゼントはオレだ、ありがとううーさー〜)	March 25, 2014

=== Season 3 ===
No.	Title	Original release date
1	"wooser's hand to mouth life is back again"	July 4, 2015
2	"Wooser the Strategist and His Cunning Plan" "Sakushi Ūsā, Sono Hiretsunaru Bōryaku" (策士うーさー、その卑劣なる謀略)	July 10, 2015
3	"Wooser-sensei's Battle with Deadlines" "Usā-sensei, Shimekiri to Notatakai" (うーさー先生、締め切りとの戦い)	July 17, 2015
4	"Everything Becomes J/K" "Ūsā Kyōju Iwaku, Subere wa J/k ni Naru" (うーさー教授曰く、すべてはJ/Kになる)	July 24, 2015
5	"Wooser53, I'm Going to Be an Idol" "Ūsā53, Watashi Aidoru ni Narimasu" (うーさー53、私アイドルになります)	July 31, 2015
6	"Director Wooser and the Twilight Age of Movie Madness" "Ūsā Kantoku, Tasogare no Eiga Kyōjidai" (うーさー監督、黄昏の映画狂時代)	August 7, 2015
7	"The Villager Wooser and His True Bestial Nature" "Murabito Ūsā, Sono Kemono no Honsei" (村人うーさー、その獣の本性)	August 14, 2015
8	"Daydreaming Wooser Transforms Once More" "Hakuchūmu Ūsā no Henshin Futatabi" (白昼夢うーさーの変身ふたたび)	August 21, 2015
9	"Blue Seas, White Sand, Black Wooser" "Aoi Umi Shiroi Sunahama, Kuroi Ūsā" (青い海白い砂浜、黒いうーさー)	August 28, 2015
10	"Hunter Wooser and the Law of the Festival" "Hantā Ūsā, Matsuri no Okite" (ハンターうーさー、祭りの掟)	September 4, 2015
11	"Detective Wooser's Final Problem" "Mei Tantei Ūsā, Saigo no Jiken" (名探偵うーさー、最後の事件)	September 11, 2015
12	"Wooser's Kind World" "Ūsā no Yasashī Sekai" (うーさーの優しい世界)	September 18, 2015
13	"Wooser's Hand to Mouth Life a Dream Play.."	September 25, 2015
