= Mikoi Sasaki =

Japanese voice actress (born 1991)

- 佐々木 未来
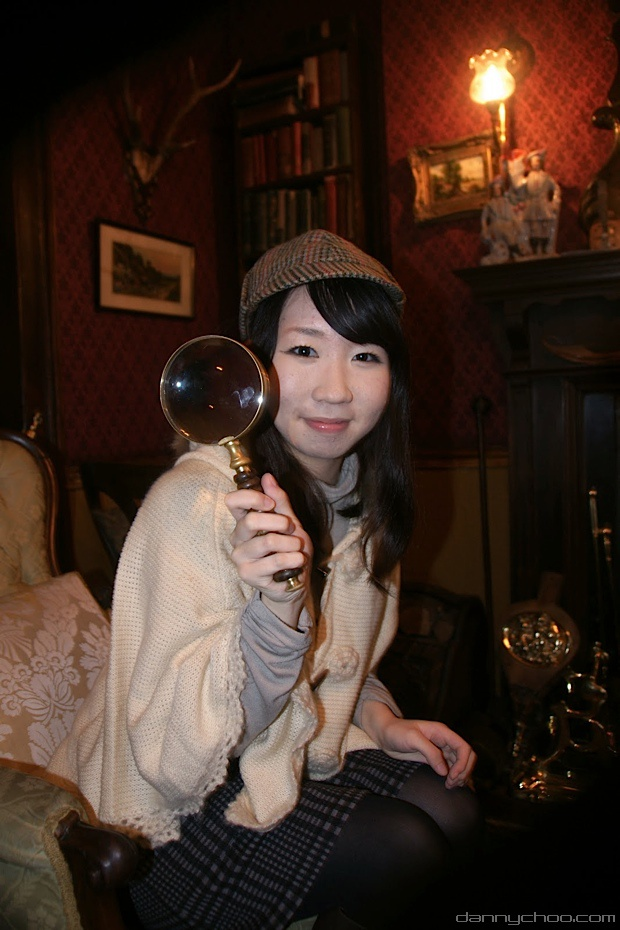
- Born: March 30, 1991 (age 35); Morioka, Iwate Prefecture, Japan
- Occupation: Voice actress
- Years active: 2010–present
- Agent: Hibiki
- Height: 160 cm (5 ft 3 in)

Mikoi Sasaki (佐々木未来, Sasaki Mikoi; born March 30, 1991) is a Japanese voice actress known for her role as Hercule Barton in Tantei Opera Milky Holmes, and her other major roles include Himeno Katsuragi in Da Capo III, Kuguru Uki in Future Card Buddyfight, and Neko in Recently, My Sister Is Unusual. Sasaki was chosen from thousands of people who auditioned for roles in Milky Holmes. She is a member of the singer group Milky Holmes, formed by the four main voice actresses in Tantei Opera Milky Holmes. In 2020, during a video on her shared YouTube channel, she stated that she would like for her display photo on Wikipedia (which is from 2010) to be changed to a more recent one. As of November 2026, this has yet to occur.

== Career ==
On April 10, 2020, Sasaki, Aimi, and Ayasa Itō started their own YouTube channel under the name of the Three Voice Acting Sisters [Team Y]. In a video posted in October 2020, Sasaki and the two others stated that they wished for their YouTube channel to be detailed in their Wikipedia pages.

== Filmography ==
=== Anime television series ===
- Tantei Opera Milky Holmes (2010), Hercule Barton
- Tantei Opera Milky Holmes: Act 2 (2012), Hercule Barton
- Muv-Luv Alternative: Total Eclipse (2012), Natasha Ivanova
- Outbreak Company (2013), Kusako El
- Da Capo III (2013), Himeno Katsuragi
- Futari wa Milky Holmes (2013), Hercule Barton
- Cardfight!! Vanguard G (2014), Kumi Okazaki
- Recently, My Sister Is Unusual (2014), Neko
- Future Card Buddyfight (2014), Kuguru Uki
- Tantei Opera Milky Holmes TD (2015), Hercule Barton
- Etotama (2015), Piyotan
- PriPara (2015), Reika
- Nazotokine (2016), Natsuko Yanagisawa
- Show by Rock!!# (2016), Candy Lapin
- Kemono Friends (2017) Royal penguin (eps. 1 - 10, 12), Tasmanian Devil (ep. 2)
- Hulaing Babies (2019), Fumi
- Hulaing Babies☆Petit (2020), Fumi
- Rebirth (2020), Kurumi
- Teppen!!!!!!!!!!!!!!! Laughing 'til You Cry (2022), Yuzu Hosono
- Peter Grill and the Philosopher's Time: Super Extra (2022), Gobco Ngière
- YouTuNya (2023), Kawaii ne Onee-san
- The Great Cleric (2023), Kururu
- Sasaki and Peeps (2024), Shop Clerk
- Plus-Sized Elf (2024), Hitome
- Goodbye, Dragon Life (2024), Diadra
- Murai no Koi (2024), Hitomi Nishifuji

=== Anime films ===
- Neppu Kairiku Bushi Road (2013), Rin

=== OVAs ===
- Shiba Inuko-san (2012), Shiba Inuko-san
- Kamisama Kiss (2013)

=== Video games ===
- Revue Starlight Re LIVE (2018–2019), Shizuha Kochō
- Brown Dust 2 (2023), Eclipse
- Honkai: Star Rail (2025), The Dahlia
- Goddess of Victory: Nikke (2026), Snow Crane

=== Drama CDs ===
- Chatting at the Amber Teahouse (2011), customer
- Girl Friends (2011), Mariko Kumakura
- Tantei Opera Milky Holmes (2011), Hercule Barton
