= Tia (singer) =

- Born: Saitama, Japan
- Genre: J-pop
- Occupations: Singer; songwriter
- Years active: 2012–present
- Labels: Aniplex (2012); Dive II Entertainment (2014–present)
- Website: avex.jp/tia/

Tia is a Japanese singer-songwriter from Saitama who is signed to Dive II Entertainment. Discovered and produced by Ryo of Supercell, Tia made her debut signed to Aniplex in 2012 with her single "Love Me Gimme". She moved to the record label Dive II Entertainment in 2014.

== Career ==
While attending junior-high school, Tia streamed live videos of her singing on the Niconico video sharing website. Ryo of Supercell took an interest in Tia via these broadcasts and began collaborating with Tia in 2012 when she was in high school. Tia made her debut signed to Aniplex with her single "Love Me Gimme" (ラブミーギミー) released on December 19, 2012; the song is used as the ending theme to the 2012 anime series Wooser's Hand-to-Mouth Life. She moved to the record label Dive II Entertainment in 2014 and released her second single "Heart Realize" (ハートリアライズ) on March 12, 2014; the song is used as the ending theme to the 2014 anime series Noragami. Tia graduated high school in March 2014. Tia's third single "The Glory Days" was released on October 15, 2014; the song is used as the second ending theme to the 2014 anime series Captain Earth. Her fourth single "Nirvana" (ニルバナ) was released on November 25, 2015; the song is used as the ending theme to the 2015 anime series Noragami Aragoto. Tia's fifth single "Deal with the devil" was released on August 23, 2017; the song is used as the opening theme to the 2017 anime series Kakegurui.

== Voice roles ==
=== Anime ===
2012

- Wooser's Hand-to-Mouth Life (Yuu)

2014

- Wooser's Hand-to-Mouth Life: Kakusei-hen (Yuu)

== Discography ==
=== Singles ===
Year	Song	Peak Oricon chart positions	Album
2012	"Love Me Gimme"	21	
2014	"Heart Realize"	17	
2014	"The Glory Days"	34	
2015	"Nirvana"	46	
2017	"Deal with the devil"	35	
