= Takaaki Kidani =

Japanese video game developer and entrepreneur (born 1960)

- 木谷 高明
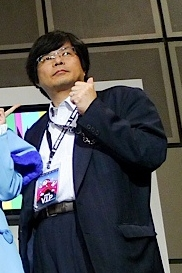
- Born: June 6, 1960 (age 66); Kanazawa, Ishikawa, Japan
- Education: Musashi University
- Occupations: Video game developer, entrepreneur

Takaaki Kidani (木谷 高明, Kidani Takaaki; born June 6, 1960) is a Japanese video game developer and entrepreneur born in Kanazawa, Japan. He is the founder of Bushiroad.

Kidani briefly served as the chairman of New Japan Pro-Wrestling (NJPW), when they were under Bushiroad ownership.

== Early life ==
After Kidani graduated from Musashi University with a degree in economics, he worked at Yamaichi Securities. He handled American duties.

== Broccoli ==
Kidani formerly from Yamaichi Securities in 1994. On March 25 of the same year, he founded Broccoli as a startup company. At first, his business focused on event management, but from 1994 to 1998, he started Comic Castle for dōjinshi. In 1996, he established his first chain of retail stores Gamers. His company has its center focus on anime and video games. Their company performance increased after producing the anime series Di Gi Charat and his company was then listed on the JASDAQ Securities Exchange.

== Bushiroad ==
He founded Bushiroad in May 2007 as a company that produces card games and assumed the position of president. The origin of the name Bushiroad comes from the failure to make Neppu Kairiku Bushi Road into a film due to various reasons when he led the project in the days of Broccoli. The film was restarted in March 2013 with Kidani as the executive producer. The company would create numerous media franchises including Tantei Opera Milky Holmes and BanG Dream!.

On October 2, 2017, Bushiroad announced that Kidani would be stepping down as the company's Representative Director on October 20 and joining its board of directors. He remained the company's president and CEO until July 28, 2026, when he transferred those positions to BanG Dream! producer Yuki Nemoto.

== Awards ==
- Wrestling Observer Newsletter
  - Promoter of the Year (2014, 2017, 2018)
