= BBK/BRNK =

Japanese anime TV series

- Promotional poster

ブブキ・ブランキ
- Genre: Mecha
- Anime television series
- Directed by: Daizen Komatsuda
- Written by: Jirō Ishii; Yukinori Kitajima
- Music by: Masaru Yokoyama
- Studio: Sanzigen
- Licensed by: AUS: Madman
- Original network: Tokyo MX, AT-X, KBS, TV Aichi, BS11, Sun TV
- Original run: January 9, 2016 – March 26, 2016
- Episodes: 12
- Anime television series

BBK/BRNK 2: The Gentle Giants of the Galaxy
- Directed by: Daizen Komatsuda
- Written by: Jirō Ishii; Yukinori Kitajima
- Music by: Masaru Yokoyama
- Studio: Sanzigen
- Licensed by: NA: Crunchyroll
- Original network: AT-X, Tokyo MX, KBS, TV Aichi, Sun TV, BS11
- Original run: October 1, 2016 – December 17, 2016
- Episodes: 12

BBK/BRNK, also known as Bubuki/Buranki (ブブキ・ブランキ), is a Japanese anime television series created by Sanzigen to celebrate their 10th anniversary. It aired from January 2016 to March 2016. The opening theme is "Beat your Heart" by Konomi Suzuki and the ending theme is "Anger/Anger" by Myth & Roid. The series is available for streaming on Crunchyroll.

A second season announced at the end of the first season's final episode, subtitled The Gentle Giants of the Galaxy (星の巨人, Hoshi no Kyojin) aired from October 2016 to December 2016. The opening theme is "Reirō taru Junketsu wa 'Kōen' no Kairai o Hayarase, Gyōten ni Kirameku Akashi o Kizamu" by Megumi Han, and the ending theme is "so beautiful ;- )" by Mikako Komatsu.

== Plot ==
Azuma Kazuki is a young boy living with his family on Treasure Island (宝島), a floating island several thousand feet above Earth that is inhabited by giant sentient robots called Buranki (ブランキ), all of which are "sleeping". However, several of the Buranki are killed to wake up, forcing Migiwa Kazuki, his mother, to send Azuma, his identical twin sister Kaoruko, and their father down to Earth and is killed in a Buranki named Oubu for safety, leaving her behind.

Ten years later, Azuma, returning to a post-apocalyptic Shinjuku is captured by the authorities, but was saved by his childhood friend Kogane Asabuki, a user of a sentient weapon known as Bubuki (ブブキ), which also forms a Buranki's limbs. Discovering he is a Bubuki-user himself with the Heart of Oubu, Azuma and Kogane unite with three other Bubuki-users: Hiiragi Nono, Kinoa Ōgi and Shizuru Taneomi, to work together to seek and revive the lost Oubu, and discover the hidden truths behind the Buranki and the mysterious Reoko Banryū's tyranny over the post-apocalyptic Japan with her own Buranki: Entei.

== Characters ==
=== Oubu ===
Oubu (王舞, Ōbu) is a powerful Buranki once owned by Migiwa Kazuki. When the Buranki on Treasure Island started to awaken ten years prior to the series, she had her husband and two children sent down to Earth with it, crash landing into Japan's shores and causing much destruction in its wake. At some point, its limbs were reverted into Bubukis and returned to their owners, and all that remains is its skeletal husk stored in an underground Buranki Jail. In the present day, Oubu's Bubuki has been inherited by the children of their owners, now working with Migiwa's son Azuma, who has inherited its Heart, to reawaken Oubu and travel back to Treasure Island to find out the truth behind the Burankis.

Azuma Kazuki (一希 東, Kazuki Azuma)
Voiced by: Yūsuke Kobayashi, Voiced by: Yuka Terasaki (junior)
A kindhearted young boy with a strong sense of justice, he returns to Japan at the start of the series only to be arrested by the Bubuki Police while clueless to what a Bubuki is, as he has lived his childhood on Treasure Island full of full-sized Burankis and has never seen one split into its Bubuki parts. After Kogane rescues him and he meets the other Bubuki-users, he awakens his own Bubuki while trying to protect Righty: Oubu's Heart (王舞の心臓, Ōbu no Shinzō), which he unknowingly had inherited from his mother. As a Heart-user, Azuma is able to awaken and assemble Oubu, as well as act as one with it as its main controller, though as such, when Oubu takes damage, he would also feel the pain, and Oubu's performance also depends on his emotional and physical condition.
Kogane Asabuki (朝吹 黄金, Asabuki Kogane)
Voiced by: Ari Ozawa
A young girl who is Azuma's childhood best friend. Her Bubuki is Raijoudou (ライジョウドウ), a completely sentient glove that is able to move around and act on its own, which she nicknames Righty (右手ちゃん, Migite-chan). Her Bubuki forms Oubu's right arm.
Hiiragi Nono (野々 柊, Nono Hiiragi)
Voiced by: Sōma Saitō
An arrogant young boy who desires to seek revenge on Reoko Banryū for her tyranny, and self-proclaimed leader of Oubu's team. His Bubuki is Iwatooshi (イワトオシ), a spear that is able to fly around to assist his attacks. His Bubuki forms Oubu's left leg.
Kinoa Ōgi (扇 木乃亜, Ōgi Kinoa)
Voiced by: Shizuka Ishigami
A brazen young girl who wears glasses. Her Bubuki is a pair of swords named Himekiri (ヒメキリ) and Hoemaru (ホエマル) that are able to fly, and they form Oubu's left arm. Years before the story, the very thought of using her bubuki terrified her. However, Soya, pretending to be a government agent, convinced her to trust them, seducing her in the process.
Shizuru Taneomi (種臣 静流, Taneomi Shizuru)
Voiced by: Mikako Komatsu
A quiet girl who goofed around, though she is not really as she seems. Her Bubuki is Tsurarai (ツラライ), a rifle that is able to fire bullets that can curve to hit their targets, and forms Oubu's right leg.

=== Entei ===
Entei (炎帝) is a Buranki owned by Reoko Banryū, rivalling Oubu in terms of power. 24 years prior to the series, a battle between the two Buranki ended up with Entei's limbs being permanently torn apart and destroyed, while Reoko mysteriously gained immortality as an outcome of the conflict. Since then, Entei uses a pair of pseudo tentacle-like limbs to battle, with Reoko constantly on the hunt for spare Hearts and parts strong enough to withstand Entei's power to once again complete Entei and exact her revenge on Oubu and Migiwa. Her comrades, dubbed the Four Heavenly Kings (四天王, shitenou), however, now having lost their original Bubuki, use their own substitute Bubuki they won off from other users through battle, and continue to support Reoko till current day, even though their current weapons are not strong enough to form up Entei anymore.

Reoko Banryū (万流 礼央子, Banryū Reoko)
Voiced by: Megumi Han
A young woman who once wielded Entei's Heart (炎帝の心臓, Entei no Shinzō), she and Migiwa were best friends back in high school. When she was told she only had three years left to live, she decided to make Entei and the other Buranki known to the world, but Migiwa interfered in this to save her: Destroying Entei's limbs with Oubu, Migiwa crushed Entei's Heart, causing a new Core to painfully manifest within Reoko, turning her into Entei's new Heart and granting her immortality as a result. Following the years, having been locked up in Migiwa's mansion, Reoko becomes conflicted about her unchanging appearance despite the many years that has passed and starts to feel hatred and repulse towards Migiwa. Released upon Migiwa's departure to Treasure Island, Reoko reunites with her comrades as they overthrow the government that has been killing Bubuki-users, creating a new one that serves as her puppet for her plans to exact revenge against Migiwa for what she has done to her.
Being Entei's Heart herself, her powers are similar to Azuma's, though with every time she controls Entei she brings fatal damage onto herself, and despite her body being able to revive and restore itself to a near-perfect condition, the brain-damage she receives cannot recover, her memories eventually being eaten away every time she dies.
Shūsaku Matobai (的場井 周作, Matobai Shūsaku)
Voiced by: Kenjiro Tsuda
The oldest among the Four Heavenly Kings, his unnamed Bubuki is a pistol that like Tsurarai, can fire bullets that home in on their targets to hit their mark, but its bullets are stronger than those fired by Tsurarai. He previously formed Entei's right arm.
Zetsubi Hazama (間 絶美, Hazama Zetsubi)
Voiced by: Yōko Hikasa
One of the Four Heavenly Kings who previously fooled Oubu's users into her plans under the alias Mami Horino (堀野 真実, Horino Mami). Her unnamed Bubuki is a pocketwatch that allows her to transcend time and space for a few seconds, while its hands can extend to be used as blades. She previously formed Entei's left leg.
Sōya Arabashiri (新走 宗也, Arabashiri Sōya)
Voiced by: Subaru Kimura
The youngest among the Four Heavenly Kings, he is also Reoko's doctor, and the most concerned regarding her condition. His unnamed Bubuki is a set of rings that creates illusions, as well as being able to fire lasers. He previously formed Entei's left arm.
Akihito Tsuwabuki (石蕗 秋人, Tsuwabuki Akihito)
Voiced by: Kazuyuki Okitsu
A genius and strategist of the Four Heavenly Kings, he was also Shizuru's former mentor. His unnamed Bubuki is a fountain pen that is able to turn what it writes into reality (such as writing "nothingness" (無, mu) would cancel out an attack), and produce a laser blade. He previously formed Entei's right leg.

=== United States ===
A team of Bubuki-users from America, representing their Buranki Megalara (メガララ, Megarara). Due to their Buranki being rendered unusable as a result of Migiwa releasing an energy wave that deactivates all Buranki Hearts on Earth, they have been sent to Japan by a mysterious benefactor to fight Oubu's and Entei's teams for their working Hearts. Their Bubuki are named after film directors.

Epizo Evans (エピゾ・エヴァンズ, Epizo Evansu)
Voiced by: Yoshimasa Hosoya
The big-hearted plus-sized leader of the United States' Buranki team and user of Megalara's Heart (メガララの心臓, Megarara no Shinzō), though because he is so airheaded his comrades rarely listen to him nor treat him of much use since his Heart is unusable.
Luis Garcia (リュイス・ガルシア, Ryuisu Garushia)
Voiced by: Ryuichi Kijima
User of the Bubuki Cassavetes Boomerang (カサヴェテス・ブーメラン, Kasavetesu Būmeran), which forms Megalara's right arm.
Farrah Umlauf (ファラー・ウムラウフ, Farā Umuraufu)
Voiced by: Ikumi Hayama
User of the Bubuki Friedkin Tomahawk (フリードキン・トマホーク, Furīdokin Tomahōku), which forms Megalara's left arm.
Waglula Hara (ワグルラ・ハラ, Wagurura Hara)
Voiced by: Daiki Yamashita
User of the Bubuki Silver Peckinpah (シルバー・ペキンパー, Shirubā Pekinpā), a tommy gun which forms Megalara's left foot.
Domina Dorsey (ドミナ・ドーシ, Domina Dōshi)
Voiced by: Azumi Waki
User of the Bubuki Siegel Hammer (シーゲル・ハンマー, Shīgeru Hanmā), a mace which forms Megalara's right foot.

=== Russia ===
The last of a clan of assassins, the Bubuki-users from Russia represent their Buranki Zanpaza (ザンパザ). However, just like the United States' team, their Heart was deactivated by Migiwa, and are thus sent by the same mysterious benefactor to Japan retrieve functioning Hearts from Oubu's and Entei's teams, although using more rough and violent methods to achieve their goal.

Maxim Arsenyevich Balakirev (マクシム・アルセー二エヴィチ・バラキレフ, Makushimu Arusēnievichi Barakirefu)
Voiced by: Kengo Kawanishi
The cruel genius leader of the Russian Buranki team and user of Zanpaza's Heart (ザンパザの心臓, Zanpaza no Shinzō). Due to being born and raised of an elite status, he harbors a superiority complex, often treating his leg Bubuki-users like dirty rats due to their lack of a home or status, and will not hesitate to sacrifice others to achieve his goals.
Lyudmila Arsenyevna Balakireva (リュドミラ・アルセー二エヴナ・バラキレヴァ, Ryudomira Arusēnievuna Barakireva)
Voiced by: Azumi Asakura
Maxim's younger sister and Diana's older twin sister. She and her sister often target Shizuru due to also having been mentored by Akihito. She uses the Bubuki Schvedochka (シュベドッカ, Shubedokka), a scythe which forms Zanpaza's right arm.
Diana Arsenyevna Balakireva (ジアーナ・アルセー二エヴナ・バラキレヴァ, Jiāna Arusēnievuna Barakireva)
Voiced by: Yū Kobayashi
Maxim's younger sister and Lyudmila's younger twin sister. She and her sister often target Shizuru due to also having been mentored by Akihito. She uses the Bubuki Zvyozdachka (ズヴョズダチカ, Zuvyozudachika), a hammer which forms Zanpaza's left arm.
Ignat Bosporus (イグナート・ボスボロス, Igunāto Bosuborosu)
Voiced by: Makoto Furukawa
A young man who remains faithfully loyal to the Arsenyevna twins despite how cruel their brother treats him and Dersu for being homeless street rats. He uses the Bubuki Morgli Yorjig (モークリ・ヨージク, Mōguri Yōjigu), a saw which forms Zanpaza's left leg.
Dersu Nizhny (デルス・ニジニ, Derusu Nijini)
Voiced by: Seiichirō Yamashita
A quiet young boy who shows almost no emotions and is Ignat's best friend. He uses the Bubuki Anba (アンバ), a staff which forms Zanpaza's right leg.

== Episode list ==
=== BBK/BRNK ===
No.	Title	Original release date
1	"Witch's Son" "Majo no musuko" (Japanese: 魔女の息子)	January 9, 2016
2	"Fire titan" "Honō no kyojin" (Japanese: 炎の巨人)	January 16, 2016
3	"The heart and limbs" "Shinzō to teashi" (Japanese: 心臓と手足)	January 23, 2016
4	"Right hand and a pistol" "Migite to kenjuu" (Japanese: 右手と拳銃)	January 30, 2016
5	"2 swords and 8 rings" "Ken to Yubiwa" (Japanese: 剣と指輪)	February 6, 2016
6	"The Gray Jewel" "Haiiro no Hōseki" (Japanese: 灰色の宝石)	February 13, 2016
7	"The Headless Titan" "Kubinashi Kyojin" (Japanese: 首なし巨人)	February 20, 2016
8	"The Stopped Heart" "Tomatta shinzō" (Japanese: 止まった心臓)	February 27, 2016
9	"Fist and Fist" "Kobushi to kobushi" (Japanese: 拳と拳)	March 5, 2016
10	"The Shattered Heart" "Kudakareru shinzō" (Japanese: 砕かれる心臓)	March 12, 2016
11	"The Immortal Girl" "Fushi no shōjo" (Japanese: 不死の少女)	March 20, 2016
12	"The Boy from Treasure Island" "Takarajima no shōnen" (Japanese: 宝島の少年)	March 27, 2016

=== BBK/BRNK: The Gentle Giants of the Galaxy ===
No.	Title	Original release date
1	"Black Oubu" "Kuro Oubu" (Japanese: 黒)	October 1, 2016
2	"The False Hope" "Soradanomi" (Japanese: 空頼み)	October 8, 2016
3	"The Right Hand's Scar" "Migite no kizu" (Japanese: 右手の傷)	October 15, 2016
4	"The Hunter's Bullet" "Hantaa no dangan" (Japanese: ハンターの弾丸)	October 22, 2016
5	"The Island Fortress" "Eigo no Yousai" (Japanese: 英語の要塞)	October 29, 2016
6	"The Butterfly and the Gallows" "Chouto koushudai" (Japanese: 蝶と絞首台)	November 5, 2016
7	"Older Brother and Younger Sister" "Ani to imouto" (Japanese: あにといもうと)	November 12, 2016
8	"The Rebellious Limb" "Hankou tekina teashi" (Japanese: 反抗的な手足)	November 19, 2016
9	"Swan Song" "Hakuchou no uta" (Japanese: はくちょうのうた)	November 28, 2016
10	"The Comet Opens Its Eyes" "Suisei no me wo hiraki" (Japanese: 彗星の目を開き)	December 4, 2016
11	"The Gentle Giants Of The Galaxy" "Ginga no yasashii kyojin" (Japanese: ぎんがのやさしいきょじん)	December 11, 2016
12	"Three Shining Stars" "Mittsu no kagayaku hoshi" (Japanese: 三つの輝く星)	December 17, 2016

== Reception ==
The Encyclopedia of Science Fiction described Bubuki Buranki as an entertaining anime, praising its likeable protagonists and frequently impressive animation, particularly the imposing design of Deus Magna, while finding most of the other mecha overly toy-like. It considered the plot at times overstretched, especially during the first half of the second season, where it regarded fan service as padding, and criticized Guy as a clichéd megalomaniacal villain and Shizuru as an underdeveloped character. The encyclopedia also identified religion as a recurring theme of the anime, particularly through competing ideas about humanity's dominion over Earth and the Buranki's place within a larger cosmic order.
