= Sanzigen =

Japanese animation studio

Sanzigen Inc.

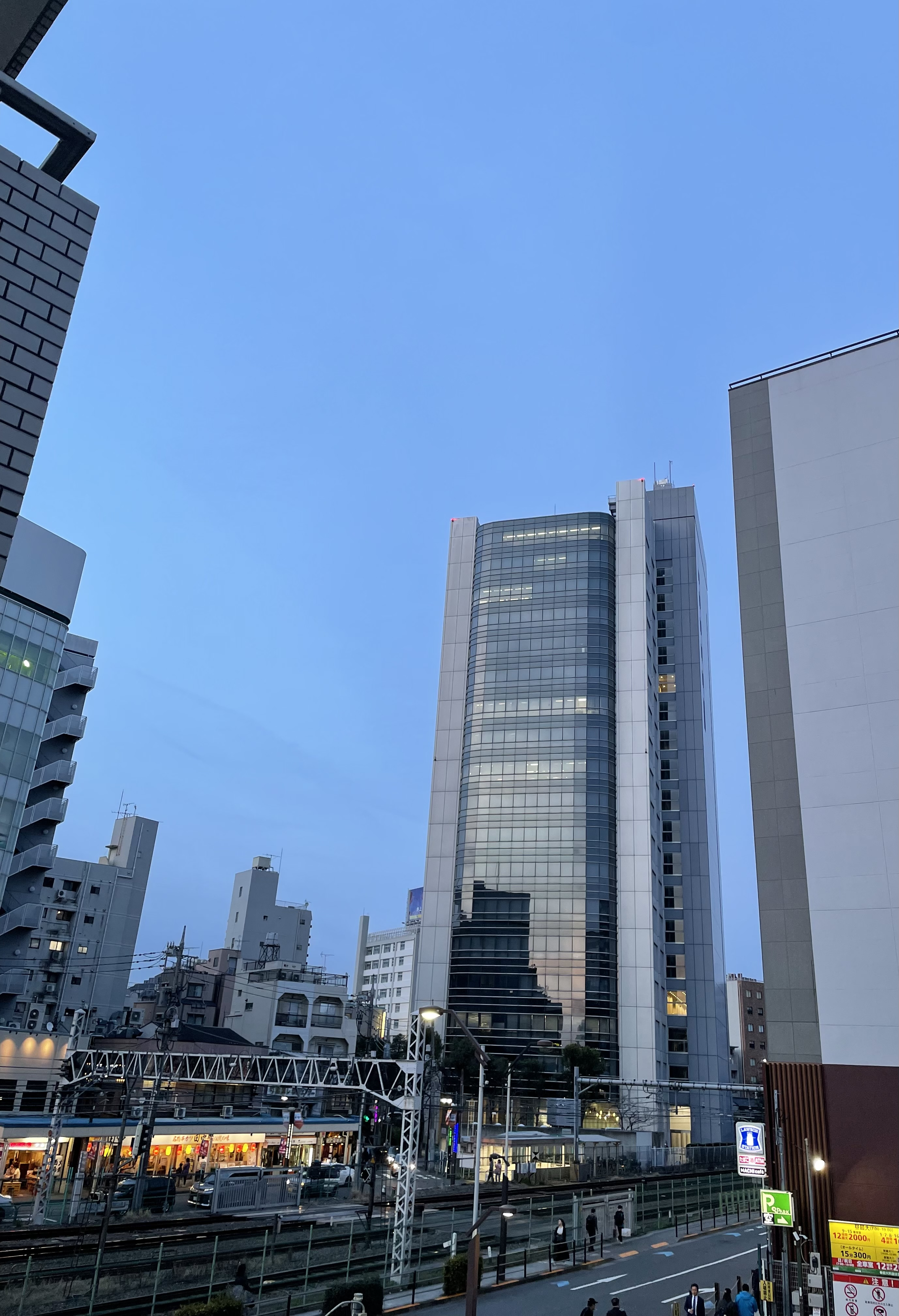
- Headquarters in Suginami, Tokyo
- Native name: 株式会社サンジゲン
- Romanized name: Kabushiki-gaisha Sanjigen
- Type: Kabushiki-gaisha
- Industry: CGI animation studio
- Founded: 3 March 2006; 20 years ago
- Founders: Hiroaki Matsuura; Daisuke Suzuki; Hiroshi Adachi; Shinsaku Nagura; Kentaro Shiga
- Headquarters: Kamiogi, Suginami, Tokyo, Japan
- Area served: Worldwide
- Key people: Hiroaki Matsuura (representative director); Daisuke Suzuki (director)
- Owner: Ultra Super Pictures (75.4%); Hiroaki Matsuura (16.4%); Bushiroad (8.2%)
- Number of employees: 320 (as of June 2022)
- Divisions: Nichicaline; Sanzigen Photography Department
- Subsidiaries: eDITz
- Website: sanzigen.co.jp

Sanzigen Inc. (Japanese: 株式会社サンジゲン, Hepburn: Kabushiki-gaisha Sanjigen) is a Japanese animation studio specializing in CGI animation. Founded in 2003, the studio is best known for producing anime including Arpeggio of Blue Steel, Miss Monochrome, The Heroic Legend of Arslan, BanG Dream!, and D4DJ.

== History ==
The studio was founded in 2003, later becoming formally incorporated in 2006 by former employees of Gonzo, and has contributed to various anime series and films. Its name is derived from the Japanese word for "three-dimensional" (三次元, sanjigen). Sanzigen joined the Japanese joint holding company Ultra Super Pictures with studios Ordet and Trigger, that would later be joined by Liden Films.

On 13 December 2019, Bushiroad announced that it had acquired 8.2% of Sanzigen. Ultra Super Pictures now owns 75.4% of Sanzigen and studio president Hiroaki Matsuura owns 16.4% of the company.

On 10 February 2020, it was announced that Sanzigen had formed a partnership with Millepensee to form a new CG studio lXlXl.

On 7 September 2025, Sanzigen founded their 2D animation brand Nichicaline, focusing on 2-dimensional animation works to differentiate from their main brand.

== Works ==
=== Television series ===
Title	Broadcast channel	First run start date	First run end date	Director	Eps	Note(s)	Ref(s)
Black Rock Shooter	Fuji TV (Noitamina)	February 2, 2012	March 22, 2012	Shinobu Yoshioka	8	Based on the media franchise created by Huke. Co-production with Ordet.	
Wooser's Hand-to-Mouth Life	TV Tokyo	October 3, 2012	December 19, 2012	Toyonori Yamada	12	Based on the manga by Yoshiki Usa and Tomoki Fujinoki.	
Miss Monochrome (season 1)	TV Tokyo	October 3, 2013	December 24, 2013	Yoshiaki Iwasaki	13	Original work. Co-production with Liden Films.	
Arpeggio of Blue Steel -Ars Nova-	JNN (MBS)	October 7, 2013	December 23, 2013	Seiji Kishi	12	Based on the manga by Ark Performance.	
Wooser's Hand-to-Mouth Life: Awakening Arc	TV Tokyo	January 7, 2014	March 25, 2014	Kenji Seto	12	Sequel to Wooser's Hand-to-Mouth Life. Co-production with Liden Films.	
The Heroic Legend of Arslan	JNN (MBS)	April 5, 2015	September 27, 2015	Noriyuki Abe	25	Based on the manga by Hiromu Arakawa. Co-production with Liden Films.	
Miss Monochrome (season 2)	Tokyo MX	July 3, 2015	September 25, 2015	Yoshiaki Iwasaki	13	Sequel to Miss Monochrome. Co-production with Liden Films.	
Wooser's Hand-to-Mouth Life: Phantasmagoric Arc	TV Tokyo	July 5, 2015	September 25, 2015	Seiji Mizushima	13	Sequel to Wooser's Hand-to-Mouth Life: Awakening Arc.	
Miss Monochrome (season 3)	Tokyo MX	October 2, 2015	December 18, 2015	Yoshiaki Iwasaki	13	Sequel to the second season of Miss Monochrome. Co-production with Liden Films.	
Heavy Object	Tokyo MX	October 2, 2015	March 26, 2016	Takashi Watanabe	24	Based on the light novel series written by Kazuma Kamachi. 3DCG work; animation production by J.C. Staff.	
BBK/BRNK	Tokyo MX	January 9, 2016	March 26, 2016	Daizen Komatsuda	12	Original work.	
BBK/BRNK: The Gentle Giants of the Galaxy	AT-X	October 1, 2016	December 17, 2016	Daizen Komatsuda	12	Sequel to Bubuki Buranki.	
ID-0	Tokyo MX	April 9, 2017	June 25, 2017	Gorō Taniguchi	12	Original work.	
BanG Dream! Girls Band Party! Pico	Tokyo MX	July 5, 2018	December 27, 2018	Seiya Miyajima	26	Related to the BanG Dream! media franchise by Bushiroad. Co-production with DMM.futureworks.	
BanG Dream! (season 2)	Tokyo MX	January 3, 2019	March 28, 2019	Kōdai Kakimoto	13	Sequel to the main BanG Dream! anime series by Issen and Xebec.	
BanG Dream! (season 3)	Tokyo MX	January 23, 2020	April 23, 2020	Kōdai Kakimoto	13	Sequel to the second season of the main BanG Dream! anime series.	
Sakura Wars: The Animation	Tokyo MX	April 3, 2020	June 19, 2020	Manabu Ono	12	Based on the video game Sakura Wars by Sega.	
Argonavis from BanG Dream!	JNN (MBS)	April 10, 2020	July 3, 2020	Hiroshi Nishikiori	13	Spin-off of the BanG Dream! media franchise.	
BanG Dream! Girls Band Party! Pico: Ohmori	Tokyo MX	May 7, 2020	October 29, 2020	Seiya Miyajima	26	Sequel to BanG Dream! Girls Band Party! Pico. Co-production with DMM.futureworks.	
D4DJ First Mix	Tokyo MX	October 30, 2020	January 29, 2021	Seiji Mizushima	13	Based on the media franchise by Bushiroad.	
D_Cide Traumerei the Animation	Tokyo MX	July 10, 2021	October 2, 2021	Yoshikazu Kon	13	Based on the media franchise by Bushiroad, Drecom, and Sumzap.	
BanG Dream! Girls Band Party! Pico Fever!	Tokyo MX	October 7, 2021	March 31, 2022	Seiya Miyajima	26	Sequel to BanG Dream! Girls Band Party! Pico: Ohmori. Co-production with DMM.futureworks.	
Morfonication	Tokyo MX	July 28, 2022	July 29, 2022	Kōdai Kakimoto; Tomomi Umetsu	2	Related to the main BanG Dream! anime series.	
D4DJ All Mix	Tokyo MX	January 13, 2023	March 31, 2023	Seiji Mizushima; Daisuke Suzuki	12	Sequel to D4DJ First Mix.	
BanG Dream! It's MyGO!!!!!	Tokyo MX	June 29, 2023	September 14, 2023	Kōdai Kakimoto	13	Spin-off of the main BanG Dream! anime series.	
Ishura	Tokyo MX	June 29, 2023	September 14, 2023	Takeo Takahashi; Yuki Ogawa	24	Based on the light novel series written by Keiso. 3DCG work; animation production by Passione.	
BanG Dream! Ave Mujica	Tokyo MX	January 2, 2025	March 27, 2025	Kōdai Kakimoto	13	Sequel to BanG Dream! It's MyGO!!!!!.	
Guilty Gear Strive: Dual Rulers	Tokyo MX	April 4, 2025	May 24, 2025	Shigeru Morikawa	8	Based on the video game Guilty Gear Strive by Arc System Works. Co-production with Arc System Works.	
Rooster Fighter	Tokyo MX	April 6, 2026	June 22, 2026	Daisuke Suzuki	12	Based on the manga by Shū Sakuratani.	
BanG Dream! Yume∞Mita	Tokyo MX	July 2, 2026	September 10, 2026	Tomomi Umetsu	13	Spin-off of the main BanG Dream! anime series. Produced under the Nichicaline brand.	
BanG Dream! MyGO!!!!! // Ave Mujica	Nippon TV (Friday Anime Night)	January 8, 2027	TBA	TBA	TBA	Sequel to BanG Dream! It's MyGO!!!!! and BanG Dream! Ave Mujica Prima Aurora.	
Zero Rise	TBA	TBA	TBA	TBA	TBA	Based on the media franchise by Bushiroad. Produced under the Nichicaline brand.	

=== Films ===
Title	Director	Release date	Note(s)	Ref(s)
009 Re:Cyborg	Kenji Kamiyama	October 27, 2012	Based on the manga Cyborg 009 by Shotaro Ishinomori. Co-production with Production I.G.	
Initial D Legend 1: Awakening	Masamitsu Hidaka	August 23, 2014	Based on the manga Initial D by Shuichi Shigeno. Co-production with Liden Films.	
Arpeggio of Blue Steel: Ars Nova DC	Seiji Kishi	January 31, 2015	Compilation film of Arpeggio of Blue Steel -Ars Nova-.	
Initial D Legend 2: Racer	Tomohito Naka	May 23, 2015	Sequel to Initial D Legend 1: Awakening. Co-production with Liden Films.	
Arpeggio of Blue Steel: Ars Nova Cadenza	Seiji Kishi	October 3, 2015	Sequel to Arpeggio of Blue Steel: Ars Nova DC.	
Initial D Legend 3: Dream	Tomohito Naka	February 6, 2016	Sequel to Initial D Legend 2: Racer. Co-production with Liden Films.	
Promare	Hiroyuki Imaishi	May 24, 2019	Original work. 3DCG work; animation production by Studio Trigger.	
BanG Dream! Film Live	Tomomi Umetsu	May 24, 2019	Related to BanG Dream!.	
BanG Dream! Episode of Roselia: Promise	Kōdai Kakimoto; Atsushi Mimura	April 23, 2021	Adaptations of stories from the video game BanG Dream! Girls Band Party!.	
BanG Dream! Episode of Roselia: Song I am.	Kōdai Kakimoto; Atsushi Mimura	June 25, 2021	Adaptations of stories from the video game BanG Dream! Girls Band Party!.	
BanG Dream! Film Live 2nd Stage	Tomomi Umetsu	August 20, 2021	Related to BanG Dream!.	
Gekijōban Argonavis: Ryūsei no Obligato	Shigeru Morikawa	November 19, 2021	Compilation film of From Argonavis.	
BanG Dream! Poppin' Dream!	Kōdai Kakimoto; Masanori Uetaka	January 1, 2022	Related to BanG Dream!.	
Gekijōban Argonavis Axia	Shigeru Morikawa	March 24, 2023	Related to From Argonavis.	
BanG Dream! Spring Sunshine, Lost Cat	Kōdai Kakimoto	September 27, 2024	Compilation films of BanG Dream! It's MyGO!!!!!.	
BanG Dream! Sing, Songs That Become Us & Film Live	Kōdai Kakimoto	November 8, 2024	Compilation films of BanG Dream! It's MyGO!!!!!.	
Labyrinth	Shōji Kawamori	January 6, 2026	Original work.	
BanG Dream! Ave Mujica Prima Aurora	Kōdai Kakimoto	October 16, 2026	Sequel to BanG Dream! Ave Mujica. Produced under the Nichicaline brand.	

=== OVA/ONAs ===
- The Heroic Legend of Arslan (2016, with Liden Films)
- Sorcery in the Big City (2017)
- D4DJ Double Mix (2022)

=== Video games ===
- Fire Emblem: Three Houses (2019) – CGI Animation
- Sakura Wars (2019) – CGI Animation
- Super Smash Bros. Ultimate (2020) – CGI Animation (Byleth Reveal Trailer)

=== Music videos ===
Title	Singer	Release date	Note(s)	Ref(s)
Spice Paradise ~Curry Meshi ver.~	Positive Passion	September 6, 2018	Collaboration between The Idolmaster Cinderella Girls and Nissin Curry Meshi.	
Find Your One Way	Naoki Hoshimoto	August 8, 2022	Created for the 1st anniversary of Guilty Gear Strive.	
SAIKYOUTICPOLKA	Omaru Polka	August 16, 2022		
What an amazing swing	Tsunomaki Watame	November 5, 2023		
How About Paipai Mask?	Houshou Marine	September 15, 2024		
Complex Princess	Houshou Marine	December 8, 2024		
Suki-Suki Diesuki Cho AyeShiteru	Houshou Marine	July 30, 2025		
Fashion Beat	Sakura Miko	March 5, 2026		
Kyapi	Houshou Marine	August 11, 2026		
PON-DERFUL!!!	Sakura Miko	October 13, 2026		
