= Miss Kobayashi's Dragon Maid: Burst Forth!! Choro-gon Breath =

- Developer(s): Kaminari Games
- Publisher(s): JP: Bushiroad; NA: Aksys Games
- Series: Miss Kobayashi's Dragon Maid
- Platform(s): Nintendo Switch; Windows
- Release: PlayStation 4 Nintendo Switch; JP: March 24, 2022; NA: August 25, 2022; Windows; October 26, 2022
- Genre(s): Bullet hell
- Mode(s): Single-player

Miss Kobayashi's Dragon Maid: Burst Forth!! Choro-gon Breath (Note: Japanese: 小林さんちのメイドラゴン 炸裂!!ちょろゴン☆ブレス, Hepburn: Kobayashi-san Chi no Meidoragon: Sakuretsu!! Choro-gon☆Buresu, stylized as Miss Kobayashi's Dragon Maid: Burst Forth!! Choro-gon☆Breath) is a 2022 bullet hell shoot 'em up video game, and the first official title to be based on the anime and manga series Miss Kobayashi's Dragon Maid. Developed by Kaminari Games and published by Bushiroad in Japan and Aksys Games in the United States, the game was released for PlayStation 4, Nintendo Switch, and Windows. Its story revolves around Kobayashi and the anime's dragon maid characters becoming magically trapped inside a cursed PC, and being forced to fight through the video games inside to escape.

The game received mixed reviews from critics, who praised some of its mechanics and its anime references, but noted its graphics and gameplay were otherwise unremarkable and would be unlikely to interest non-fans. The Switch version was criticized for an inability to play it in a vertical orientation, as is common with many shoot 'em ups on the platform.

== Gameplay ==
The game consists of the player being able to swap between three different dragon characters, Tohru, Kanna and Elma, as they engage in aerial combat against enemies and ultimately, the boss of each level. Each character has their own bullet spread, and there is also a dash that can defeat enemies with melee attacks. Combos build the player's "Dragon Meter", increasing the player's attack power. "Choro-gon Breath" functions as bombs, able to clear all enemies on screen at once. The game contains ecchi elements, with the main characters' clothing becoming damaged and more revealing if they take damage to their health bar. Collecting in-game picture pieces also unlocks risqué artwork galleries.

== Release ==
When the game was first released in Japan for console on March 24, it included full English-language support, allowing Western players to import the game prior to its Western release. Each first-run physical copy included an exclusive card from the series' trading card game. The later Director's Cut version released for Windows includes a selectable "director's cut mode" with adjusted difficulty, and new moe anthropomorphic illustrations of the stage bosses drawn by Coolkyousinnjya.

It was released for Nintendo Switch and PlayStation 4 on March 24, 2022 in Japan and August 25, 2022 in the United States. A Director's Cut version was released on Steam on October 26, 2022, solely for Windows.

== Reception ==
Reception

Review scores
Publication	Score
Famitsu	27/40
Nintendo Life	6/10 stars
TouchArcade	3/5

Famitsu magazine rated the game's PlayStation 4 version a total score of 27/40, praising the voiced cutscenes, illustrations and in-battle exchanges, but criticizing its brevity. The reviewers called it solidly made, with the idea of a bullet hell spin-off being a unique idea, but noted that the gameplay felt unsatisfactory. Tom Massey of Nintendo Life rated the Switch version of the game 6/10 stars, stating that the game's colorful artwork was appealing even with no knowledge of the anime, though he characterized its lack of a vertical rotation option as a "worrying sign". Calling it graphically simplistic, he criticized the lack of a visible hitbox on the player character. However, he noted unique mechanics such as being able to swap between characters at will, a back step ability to dodge, and a dash maneuver necessary to build up combos. He praised the game's video game parody humor and boss battles, but called it too short, with each stage lacking uniqueness, summing it up as "middling" unless one liked ecchi or bullet hell.

Shaun Musgrave of TouchArcade similarly rated the game 3/5 points, calling it "decent", but stating that it was largely targeted towards those who were both fans of the series and of shoot 'em up games, and urging non-fans to wait for a sale before buying.
