= Neppu Kairiku Bushi Road =

Japanese media franchise

- Neppu Kairiku Bushi Road key visual

熱風海陸ブシロード (Neppū Kairiku Bushirōdo)
- Manga

Neppu Kairiku Bushi Road Side: Suou
- Published by: Bushiroad
- Magazine: Monthly Bushiroad
- Original run: October 2013 – present
- Anime film
- Directed by: Masayuki Sakoi
- Produced by: Kengo Abe; Digitarou; Takeya Kinbara; Masao Morosawa; Yuuki Muramatsu; Muneki Ogasawara; Takeshi Ookawara
- Written by: Sayaka Harada; Norimitsu Kaihō; Ukyō Kodachi
- Music by: Yasuharu Takanashi
- Studio: Kinema Citrus, Orange
- Released: December 31, 2013
- Runtime: 90 minutes

Neppu Kairiku Bushi Road (Japanese: 熱風海陸ブシロード, Hepburn: Neppū Kairiku Bushi Rōdo) is a Japanese media franchise that was originally announced in 2003 by the title Neppu Kairiku Bushi Lord as a collaboration between the companies Gainax, Takara and Broccoli. After the death of story creator Sunao Yoshida in 2004 and the departure of other staff members, the project was put on indefinite hiatus, but was eventually restarted by Bushiroad in March 2013 with Bushiroad's president Takaaki Kidani as executive producer.

A 90-minute-long anime aired as part of a 3-hour special on December 31, 2013, a collaboration between Bushiroad, Bandai Visual, Nitroplus and Kinema Citrus. The anime used "Neppu Kairiku Bushi Road 〜Atsuki Houkou〜" (熱風海陸ブシロード 〜熱き咆吼〜) by Masatoshi Ono as ending theme music.

The franchise is part of Bushiroad's new trading card game Five Qross, alongside Fantasista Doll and Infinite Stratos. A manga series was serialized in Jive's shōnen manga magazine Comic Rush from December 2004 to July 2007. A spin-off manga series titled Neppu Kairiku Bushi Road Side: Suou began serialization in Bushiroad's Bushiroad Monthly magazine from October 2013.

== Plot ==
The story takes place in a time when the world is in the pits of despair after being ravaged by a poison called "shinobi" that came to earth via an asteroid. The people ran away to the place called "Kairiku," a place that used to be the bottom of the ocean. Here, the people try and protect themselves against the effects of the poison. In such a world, there was a single light of hope. The "Holy Weapon Giga Road" and the legendary warrior "Yagyuu" are needed in order to counter the effects of the poison. Ame, a princess of a fallen nation, stands up in order to save the world.

== Characters ==
Ame (アメ)
Voiced by: Megumi Han
A former princess/priestess of the country Ise.
Her mother is dead because of a shinobi. She travels with companions and a key to finding a weapon built by men who put an end to the shinobi. She has romantic feelings for Suou. In the last part of the movie, Suou is the one who survives the battle between the Tsukuyomi and cries at the end.
Yagyū Suō (スオウ)
Voiced by: KENN
He is a Yagyuu, the last of its kind. On the verge of death, he meets Ame who saves him and he decides to follow her. He has romantic feelings for Ame.
Sanda (サンダ)
Voiced by: Unshō Ishizuka
A swordsman working under Ame.
Tsukiyomi (ツキヨミ)
Voiced by: Shūta Morishima
A scholar from Ise, who was supposedly dead, but is alive for a mysterious reason. He became the leader of the shinobis.
Shin Kazusa (カズサ = シン)
Voiced by: Kōsuke Toriumi
The young leader of the country Tōra.
Hinata Hashiba (ハシバ = ヒナタ)
Voiced by: Tomo Saeki
A female officer working under Shin.
Kagato Maeda (マエダ = カガト)
Voiced by: Chihiro Suzuki
A male officer working under Shin.
Hana (ハナ)
Voiced by: Izumi Kitta
Yuzu (ユズ)
Voiced by: Sora Tokui
Rin (リン)
Voiced by: Suzuko Mimori
Eri (エリ)
Voiced by: Mikoi Sasaki
Ame's mother (アメの母, Ame no haha)
Voiced by: Miki Itō
Sonchō (村長)
Voiced by: Susumi Akagi
