= Miss Kobayashi's Dragon Maid: A Lonely Dragon Wants to Be Loved =

2025 Japanese anime film

- Theatrical release poster
- 小林さんちのメイドラゴン さみしがりやの竜
- Directed by: Tatsuya Ishihara
- Written by: Yuka Yamada
- Based on: Miss Kobayashi's Dragon Maid by Coolkyousinnjya
- Starring: Maria Naganawa; Mutsumi Tamura; Yūki Kuwahara; Yūki Takada; Minami Takahashi; Shiori Sugiura; Daisuke Ono; Yūichi Nakamura; Emiri Katō; Kaori Ishihara; Nobunaga Shimazaki; Fumihiko Tachiki
- Music by: Masumi Itō
- Production company: Kyoto Animation
- Distributed by: Shochiku
- Release date: 27 June 2025 (Japan)
- Running time: 105 minutes
- Country: Japan
- Language: Japanese

Miss Kobayashi's Dragon Maid: A Lonely Dragon Wants to Be Loved (Japanese: 小林さんちのメイドラゴン さみしがりやの竜, Hepburn: Kobayashi-san Chi no Meidoragon: Samishigariya no Ryū) is a 2025 Japanese anime fantasy comedy film produced by Kyoto Animation and based on Coolkyousinnjya's manga series Miss Kobayashi's Dragon Maid. The film was directed by Tatsuya Ishihara from a screenplay by Yuka Yamada, with Masumi Itō composing the music. It is part of the anime continuity following Miss Kobayashi's Dragon Maid S.

The film premiered theatrically in Japan on 27 June 2025. Crunchyroll acquired theatrical rights outside Asia and released the film in select United States theaters with Sony Pictures Entertainment on 20 October 2025 as the first title in its Anime Nights program.

== Plot ==
Kobayashi continues living with dragons Tohru, Kanna Kamui, and Iruru, while their other dragon friends continue adapting to ordinary human life. Kanna remains attached to Kobayashi as a parental figure, but her peaceful life is interrupted when Kimun Kamui, her biological father and the leader of the Chaos Faction, suddenly appears.

Kimun demands that Kanna return with him to the Dragon World, where war is building between the Chaos and Harmony Factions. He treats Kanna less as a daughter than as a dragon who can be used in the coming conflict, commanding her to recreate a dragon orb of immense magical power; she possesses this capability due to having broken one in the past, which was got her exiled to Earth. Kanna is hurt by his emotional distance, but she still longs for his approval so agrees to do it. Kobayashi, who has effectively raised and protected Kanna in the human world, refuses to let Kimun simply take her away.

Rather than responding only with force, Kobayashi tries to help Kimun understand human family bonds. She begins a letter exchange between Kanna and Kimun, with Tohru helping carry messages between worlds. Kanna hopes the letters will help her father understand that she wants to be loved, not merely used, while Kobayashi struggles with the fact that she loves Kanna but cannot simply decide Kanna's future for her.

The situation grows worse when Azad, a human mage serving as Kimun's strategist, is revealed to be manipulating events from behind the scenes. Azad has his own hatred of dragons and secretly works to push the Chaos and Harmony Factions toward open war. Iruru discovers signs of his interference, and is brutally beaten by his own magical abilities, but escapes to inform Kobayashi and Tohru. Meanwhile Kobayashi, lamenting her own weakness as a human, learns from her boss, Shota's father who is also a mage, about a way for her to control magic.

After receiving a letter from her father, Kanna decides to return to the Dragon World, in hopes he will finally acknowledge her feelings. Kobayashi and Tohru, unwilling to abandon her, follow her, however after entering they are separated due to Azad's magical manipulation, forcing Tohru to fight off dragons, while Kobayashi runs across the world with the help of fairies Kanna had befriended.

In the catacombs of Kimun's castle, as she is finishing the dragon orb, Kanna reveals to Azad that she is aware he wrote the letter luring her to the Dragon World. She further reveals she was also convinced not to completely abandon the Earth and humans due to Saikawa's intense friendship with her. She gets Azad to admit his intention to use the dragon orb to control the dragons and make the factions destroy one another. Unbeknownst to him, Kanna used a device to record his confession.

At the same time, after Kobayashi and Tohru reunite, they become surrounded by the Chaos and Harmony Factions, where Kobayashi uses her phone to play Kanna's recording, exposing Azad's deception to both sides. Kimun confronts Azad upon learning the truth, but refusing to accept defeat, he uses the unfinished dragon orb to seize control of all the dragons, including Kimun.

While the out-of-control Chaos and Harmony dragons are dealt with by Elma and Fafnir, Tohru fights Kimun in his giant dragon form, but even she is overpowered by his strength. Kobayashi then uses a powerful spell that can only be cast once, costing her the ability to use magic afterward. With Tohru's help, she launches the attack at Kimun, breaking Azad's control and defeating Kimun while restoring all the dragon's senses.

Azad attempts to escape, but Lucoa blocks him and Tohru confronts him. Rather than kill him, Tohru strips him of his magical power, leaving him as an ordinary human. He laments his frustration, due to losing his family over dragon violence and refusing to believe that dragon's are capable of emotional growth, with Tohru using herself as an example, thanks to Kobayashi.

Kanna attempts to try and reconcile with her father. As she and Kobayashi are about to return to the human world, Kimun, wounded and still awkward in his understanding of parenthood, tries to follow after them, causing Kanna to run back to her father and embrace him, admits that she was lonely and wanted his love. Kimun begins to understand what Kanna needed from him.

Kanna is allowed to choose where she belongs. For a moment, the others return to Kobayashi's apartment without her, causing Saikawa to believe Kanna is gone for good. Kanna then arrives at the door, having been permitted by Kimun to return to the human world while still leaving open the possibility of seeing him again. Saikawa tearfully embraces her, and Kanna resumes her life with Kobayashi, Tohru, and her friends.

== Voice cast ==
- Maria Naganawa as Kanna Kamui
- Mutsumi Tamura as Kobayashi
- Yūki Kuwahara as Tohru
- Yūki Takada as Elma
- Minami Takahashi as Lucoa
- Shiori Sugiura as Iruru
- Daisuke Ono as Fafnir
- Yūichi Nakamura as Makoto Takiya
- Emiri Katō as Riko Saikawa
- Kaori Ishihara as Shōta Magatsuchi
- Sachiko Kobayashi as Felicitas
- Nobunaga Shimazaki as Azad
- Fumihiko Tachiki as Kimun Kamui

== Production ==
The film was produced by Kyoto Animation and credited to the Dragon Life Improvement Committee. The official staff list names Tatsuya Ishihara as director, Yasuhiro Takemoto as series director, Yuka Yamada as screenwriter, Miku Kadowaki as character designer and chief animation director, Shingo Kasai as art director, Naomi Takahashi as color designer, Hiroki Ueda as director of photography, Rin Yamamoto as 3D director, Yota Tsuruoka as sound director, and Masumi Itō as composer. Shochiku distributed the film in Japan.

A Lonely Dragon Wants to Be Loved adapts material from the continuing Miss Kobayashi's Dragon Maid manga, focusing on Kanna and her father. The official introduction described the film as a story of family and bonds, centering on the arrival of Kanna's real father after the dragons have gathered around Kobayashi.

== Music ==
The opening theme song is "Namida no Parade" by Fhána, returning after previous theme songs for the television anime. The ending theme song is "Bokutachi no Hibi" by Sachiko Kobayashi. Kotringo performed the insert song "Negaigoto".

The official soundtrack collection, credited to Masumi Itō, was released in Japan on 27 June 2025, the same day as the Japanese theatrical opening. The release included the opening theme, the ending theme, the insert song, and the film score.

== Release ==
Miss Kobayashi's Dragon Maid: A Lonely Dragon Wants to Be Loved was released in Japan on 27 June 2025. Japanese theater listings gave the film a runtime of 105 minutes.

Crunchyroll announced that it had acquired theatrical rights for the film outside Asia. In the United States, Crunchyroll and Sony Pictures Entertainment released the film in select theaters for one night on 20 October 2025 as part of Crunchyroll Anime Nights. The U.S. presentation was in Japanese with English subtitles.

The film later screened in the United Kingdom from 4 March 2026. Netflix Japan listed the film as a 2025 anime title with Japanese audio and subtitles in English, Japanese, Korean, and Traditional Chinese.

The Japanese Blu-ray and DVD were announced for release on 21 January 2026, with special limited Blu-ray, deluxe Blu-ray, and standard DVD editions.

== Reception ==
=== Box office ===
In Japan, the film opened in the top ten at the weekend box office after its 27 June 2025 release. By July 2025, the film had surpassed 400 million yen in cumulative box-office gross in Japan.

=== Critical response ===
Phil Hoad of The Guardian rated the film 3 out of 5 stars, praising its visual appeal while noting that viewers unfamiliar with the manga and anime might struggle with its dense continuity. Rotten Tomatoes listed one critic review for the film and reported a 3 out of 5 score from Hoad, along with verified audience ratings for the film's limited theatrical release.

Katarina McGinn of Dead Rhetoric responded positively to the film's action animation and emotional focus on Kanna, while also noting that the movie assumes familiarity with the cast and the earlier anime.
