= New Initial D the Movie =

2014-16 anime film series

- New Initial D
- Theatrical release poster

新劇場版「頭文字(イニシャル)D」
- Anime film series
- Directed by: Masamitsu Hidaka (Note: Credited as Director for film 1, and as Chief Director for films 2–3.); Tomohito Naka (#2–3)
- Written by: Mayori Sekijima
- Music by: Akio Dobashi
- Studio: Sanzigen; Liden Films
- Licensed by: AUS: Hanabee; NA: Sentai Filmworks; UK: MVM Films
- Released: Legend 1: Awakening; August 23, 2014; Legend 2: Racer; May 23, 2015; Legend 3: Dream; February 6, 2016; Battle Digest; January 7, 2022
- Runtime: 70 minutes (each)
- Films: 3

New Initial D (Japanese: 新劇場版「頭文字(イニシャル)D」, Hepburn: Shin Gekijō-ban Inisharu Dī; lit. "Initial D: New Theatrical Edition") is a 2014–2016 Japanese anime film series based on the manga series Initial D by Shuichi Shigeno. The film is a retelling of the early stages of the manga and is split into three parts with the first part, Legend 1: Awakening released on August 23, 2014. The full trailer was revealed on 16 May 2014, containing an entirely new Japanese cast. In the English dub, however, several of the Funimation cast from the original series reprised their roles for the trilogy.

Part 2 of the series, named Legend 2: Racer, was released on May 23, 2015 and part 3 of the series, named Legend 3: Dream, was released on February 6, 2016.

A compilation film, named Battle Digest, was released on January 7, 2022.

Sentai Filmworks has licensed the film trilogy for release in North America, while MVM Films released the trilogy in the UK.

== Plot ==
=== Legend 1: Awakening ===
The movie opens with Koichiro Iketani driving a lime green Nissan Silvia S13 home on Mount Akina, where he witnesses an impromptu battle between Keisuke Takahashi of the Akagi RedSuns, driving a yellow Mazda RX-7 FD and a mysterious Panda Black/White Toyota Sprinter Trueno AE86 (known simply as the "Eight-Six"), which outmaneuvers and defeats Keisuke.

The next morning, at a gas station, Iketani invites his co-workers Takumi Fujiwara and Itsuki Takeuchi to a meet with his street racing team, the Akina SpeedStars, on Akina. Later that night, they find that the Akagi RedSuns and the other members of the SpeedStars are already there. Keisuke wants to hunt down and challenge the "monstrous" Eight-Six whereas Ryosuke, Keisuke's brother and leader of the RedSuns, uses the meet to initiate his plans to dominate the Kanto region. During their practice, the inept SpeedStars are outmaneuvered by the RedSuns' advanced driving techniques; however, this does not stop Iketani from attempting to keep up. While doing so, he strikes a sharp bump on the road, making him lose control and crash.

The next day, Iketani's boss, Yuichi Tachibana, reveals that the Eight-Six is a tofu delivery vehicle owned by Bunta Fujiwara, Takumi's father. Iketani's desperately asks Bunta to be his replacement, though Bunta declines, claiming that he is too old to be Iketani's replacement. A few days later, Takumi asks Bunta to borrow the Eight-Six so that he can go on a date with his girlfriend, Natsuki. Bunta eventually accepts, but under the condition that Takumi must go to Akina on Saturday night and defeat Keisuke in a downhill race. Unbeknownst to everyone else, it was Takumi who defeated Keisuke at that first encounter as he was returning home from the morning delivery run.

Takumi later arrives at the race much to the bewilderment of the Speedstars. After Takumi explains his reason to Iketani, he agrees to let Takumi race. At the race starts, Keisuke takes the lead, but Takumi's experienced driving skills allow him to catch up as the race goes on. Eventually, Takumi overtakes and defeats Keisuke by hooking his tires in the inside gutter at the five consecutive hairpins. After the battle, Keisuke tells Takumi to not lose any race until their rematch. Despite Takumi's claim that he is not a racer, Keisuke claims that Takumi's racing skills are part of Takumi's own pride before eventually departing.

The next morning, Takumi and Natsuki play around at a beach during their date, where Takumi realizes his experience regarding the previous night's race. As Takumi embarks on his next morning delivery, he prepares himself for the races to come.

In a post-credit scene, a black Nissan Skyline GT-R R32, driven by the Myogi NightKids' Takeshi Nakazato, storms up Akina looking for Takumi's Eight-Six.

=== Legend 2: Racer ===
The film opens with Takeshi Nakazato, the Myogi NightKids' leader, challenging Ryosuke Takahashi driving a white Mazda RX-7 FC, the RedSuns' leader on a downhill battle one night. Afterwards, Nakazato tells Ryosuke that he witnessed Takumi Fujiwara's gutter technique he used to defeat Keisuke Takahashi, and believes that he battling Takumi will make things interesting. However, Ryosuke believes that Nakazato's car is incapable of defeating Takumi's Eight-Six, much to Nakazato's consternation.

The next day, Nakazato arrives at a gas station where he encounters Itsuki Takeuchi, who 'accidentally' accepts Nakazato's challenge as he drives off. However, Takumi later refuses to accept because he is not a racer despite being persuaded by Itsuki. Meanwhile, Yuichi Tachibana overhears the situation and tells the Akina SpeedStars why Takumi refuses to race. He relates to Takumi how good Nakazato is and that no one would think he's a coward if he refuses. Later, Takumi changes his mind, but when he arrives home, he is shocked to discover that his father, Bunta, is out and has taken the Eight-Six with him. Takumi waits desperately, and realizes how much of a racer he already is.

Meanwhile, in Akina, the Akina SpeedStars attempt to apologize to the NightKids for their mistake. Just as they did so, Takumi arrives in the Eight-Six, much to their relief. As the race starts, Nakazato takes the lead, whilst Ryosuke and Keisuke follow as spectators. During the race, Nakazato's AWD driving skills keep Takumi at bay. Unbeknownst to Takumi, Bunta has re-tuned the Eight-Six's suspension, allowing Takumi to stay on Nakazato's tail. As they approach the five consecutive hairpins, Nakazato blocks the inside, prompting Takumi to try and overtake Nakazato from the outside. Eventually, Nakazato drives into the outside, causing Takumi to drive into the inside, overtaking Nakazato. Nakazato attempts to block Takumi again, but his car spins out, and hits the guardrail, making him lose.

The following day, Iketani's Nissan Silvia S13 has been fully repaired, and Iketani and Itsuki take it to Akina to test drive it. They are then ambushed by a posse of NightKids led by Nakazato's teammate, Shingo Shoji, and his red Honda Civic SiR II EG6. Shingo then bumps Iketani's car, making him spin out. Takumi arrives and witnesses the situation as the NightKids drove off. Back at Akina's peak, Iketani demands Shingo's apology, which Shingo agrees if he loses his "Duct Tape Death Match" challenge against Takumi, during which the driver's right hand is taped to the steering wheel. Shingo then admits that if Takumi loses, Shingo will overthrow Nakazato as the new leader of the NightKids.

As their race starts, Takumi's tape nearly causes him to crash. He then learns that steering less will let him clear corners faster. Shingo gets impatient with Takumi's inability to crash. So, he bumps Takumi's Eight-Six, making him spin out. However, Takumi manages to avoid crashing and regains control. Enraged, Takumi drives recklessly, even going as far as cutting corners and bumping guardrails. Takumi eventually overtakes Shingo by using his gutter technique. Shingo, refusing to lose, decides to end the race in a double crash, but Takumi countersteers in time and moves out of Shingo's way, causing Shingo to crash, and lose the race.

The next day, the film ends with Takumi receiving a bouquet of flowers at work, along with a card addressed to "Panda Trueno", which then happens to be a formal challenge issued from Ryosuke Takahashi.

=== Legend 3: Dream ===
The film starts with Takumi Fujiwara chasing down the NightKids street racers for making fun of Itsuki Takeuchi's new Toyota Corolla Levin SR AE85, which Itsuki believes is an Eight-Six, and outmaneuvers them. Afterwards, Itsuki tells Takumi that he is amazed when he discovers his newfound appreciation for the car.

The next day, Takumi's upcoming battle against Ryosuke Takahashi is fast-approaching. As Takumi and his girlfriend, Natsuki Mogi, go out on a date, Takumi reflects on how far he had been racing over the summer, and becomes curious about the outcome of his upcoming battle. That night, Takumi was seen driving Koichiro Iketani's Nissan Silvia S13. That same night, his father, Bunta Fujiwara, drives the Eight-Six with Yuichi Tachibana to test his newly tuned suspension in preparation for the battle.

The next night, Ryosuke Takahashi downgrades his white Mazda RX-7 FC3S to 260 hp, which he believes would give him the advantage and power he needs to defeat Takumi. Ryosuke then comments that this approach to the race makes him think back to his earlier days of racing, as the "Akagi's White Comet".

The next day, Natsuki becomes suspicious of Takumi's lack of interest in her. She later confesses to Takumi that she knows Takumi punched her ex-boyfriend two years ago for bragging about sexually exploiting her. She even apologizes to Takumi for not explaining it to him earlier, which Takumi accepts. Takumi and Natsuki then kiss. Later on, the Akina SpeedStars suspect that Takumi's interest in Natsuki causes him to zone out, so Itsuki drives Takumi to Akina later that night to help the latter regain focus on racing. While there, they witness an impromptu battle between Takumi's previous rivals, Keisuke Takahashi and Takeshi Nakazato.

On the night before the race, Ryosuke tells Keisuke that he will retire from street racing if he loses to Takumi, but will reaffirm his plans of dominating the Kanto region. Takumi arrives, and the race begins. Takumi starts in front, but is pressured by Ryosuke's driving skills being equally matched to Takumi's, especially at his gutter run. Eventually, at the Five Consecutive Hairpins, Takumi becomes overpressured, and enters the corner too fast, making him lose control, and allowing Ryosuke take the lead.

Eventually, Ryosuke's tires wear out, and Takumi manages to come level with Ryosuke. As they approach the final corner, Takumi tries to overtake on the outside. Ryosuke's tires cause him to slide outwards, allowing Takumi to take the inside and win the race.

After the battle, Takumi asks Ryosuke why he slowed down during the last section of the race, to which Ryosuke responds by telling Takumi the truth and accepts the defeat. He then tells Takumi not to be content with a small stage like Akina, and that there is a much bigger world out there.

A few nights later, Takumi is seen racing against an orange Toyota GT86 as he races up the mountain on his morning delivery.

In a post-credits scene, Ryosuke is seen inviting Takumi to a battle as invitation to join Ryosuke's new team, Project D.

=== Battle Digest ===
A recap of the movie trilogy with additional scenes of the characters test driving their cars, focusing only on the races much like the original Battle Stages.

== Voice cast ==
Characters	Japanese voice	English voice
Takumi Fujiwara	Mamoru Miyano	Joel McDonald
Bunta Fujiwara	Hiroaki Hirata	Bill Wise
Natsuki Mogi	Maaya Uchida	Brina Palencia
Koichiro Iketani	Hiroshi Tsuchida	Eric Vale
Keisuke Takahashi	Yuuichi Nakamura	Gray G. Haddock
Ryosuke Takahashi	Daisuke Ono	J. Michael Tatum
Itsuki Takeuchi	Minoru Shiraishi	Josh Grelle
Yuichi Tachibana	Tomoyuki Shimura	Charlie Campbell
Kenji	Anri Katsu	Chris Bevins
Kenta Nakamura	Yoshiya Naruke	Jeff Collins
Takeshi Nakazato	Junichi Suwabe	Brian Mountbatten
Shingo Shoji	Shuhei Sakaguchi	Christopher Wehkamp
Mako Sato	Yumi Hara	Amber Marie Flores
Sayuki	Kaya Okuno	Monica Rial
Toyota 86 driver	Shin-ichiro Miki	

== Box office ==
Title	Release	Box office gross		
Title	Release	Japan	South Korea	East Asia (total)
Initial D Legend 1: Awakening	2014	¥72,859,615 ($687,713)	—	$687,713
Initial D Legend 2: Racer	2015	¥105,000,000 ($965,137)	—	$965,137
Initial D Legend 3: Dream	2016	¥106,000,000 ($974,328)	$33,110	$1,007,438
Total gross		¥283,859,615 ($2,627,178)	$33,110	$2,660,288

== Soundtrack ==
The film series uses a J-rock soundtrack that plays during race sequences, instead of the Eurobeat that was featured in the original anime. However, Eurobeat does return in the Battle Digest compilation film.
