= Bushiroad =

Japanese video game publisher and card game company

Bushiroad Inc.
- Logo since 2017

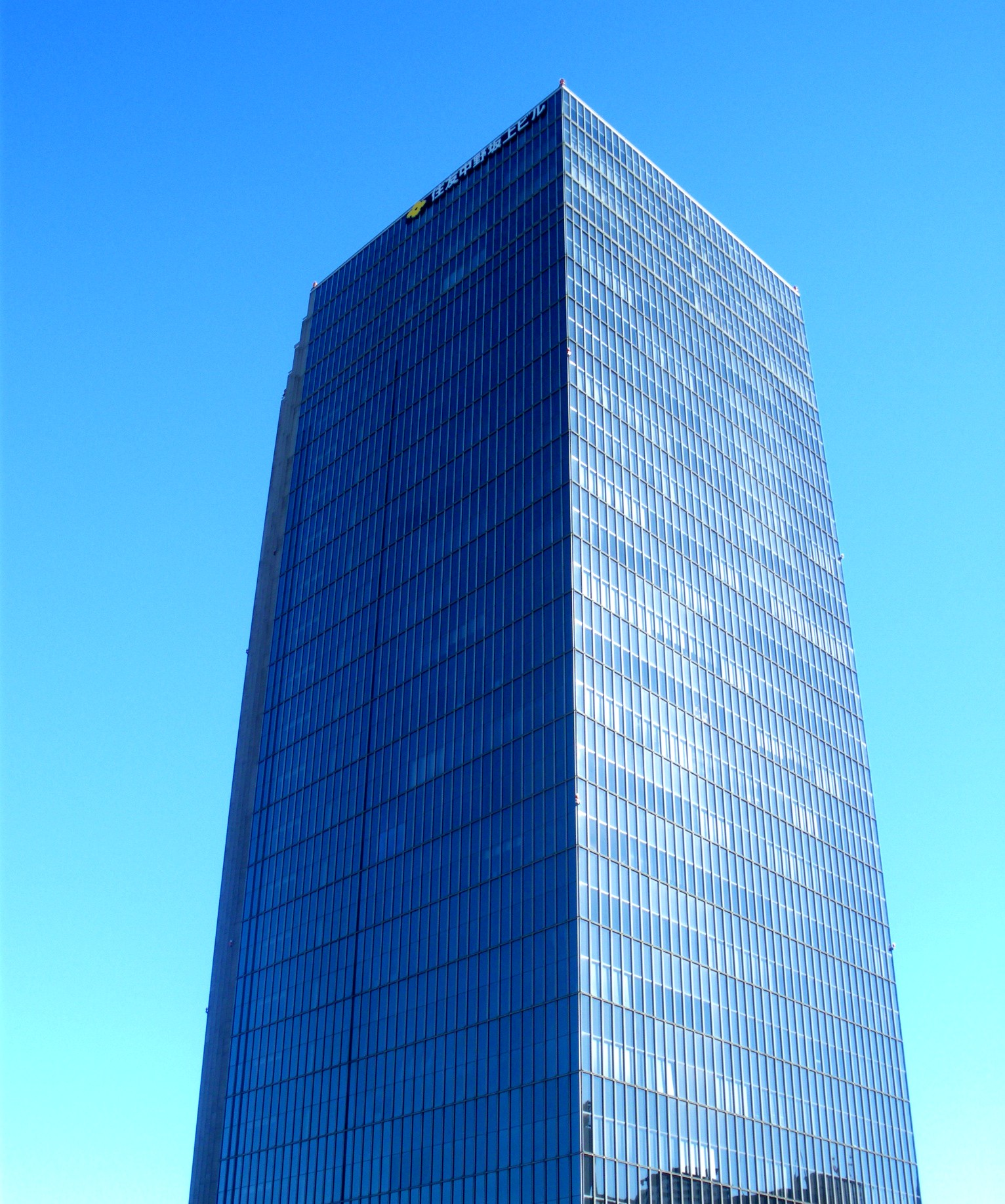
- Headquarters in Tokyo in 2009
- Native name: 株式会社ブシロード
- Romanized name: Kabushiki-gaisha Bushirōdo
- Type: Public
- Traded as: TYO: 7803
- ISIN: JP3829930001
- Industry: Video games Media and Entertainment; Collectible card games Magazines
- Founded: May 18, 2007; 19 years ago
- Founder: Takaaki Kidani
- Headquarters: Sumitomo Nakanosakaue Bldg 1-38-1 Chuo, Nakano, Tokyo, Japan
- Area served: Worldwide
- Key people: Takaaki Kidani (Chairman & Representative Director); Yuki Nemoto (President & Representative Director); Koyu Narita (Executive Vice President & Director)
- Products: Television Production; Digital media Publishing; Music; Animated feature films Live event promotion
- Brands: Cardfight!! Vanguard; Weiß Schwarz; BanG Dream! Revue Starlight
- Services: Licensing
- Revenue: ▲¥56,175 million (FY 2025)
- Operating income: ▲¥4,868 million (FY 2025)
- Net income: ▲¥4,844 million (FY 2025)
- Total assets: ▼¥49,797 million (FY 2025)
- Total equity: ▲¥25,222 million (FY 2025)
- Owners: Sumitomo Mitsui Banking Corporation (33.73%); Takaaki Kidani (17.41%); Nakano Sakagami Co., Ltd (16.65%); GREE, Inc. (4.96%)
- Number of employees: 853 (2024)
- Divisions: TCG Unit; Contents Unit; Live Entertainment Unit; MD Unit; Ad Unit; Sports Unit
- Subsidiaries: Bushiroad Creative; Bushiroad Move; Bushiroad Music; Bushiroad Music Publishing; Bushiroad USA, Inc. Bushiroad International Pte., Inc. Frontwing (50.625%); Argonavis (As of February 2022); Stardom; Bushiroad Well-Be; Bushiroad Works; Sanzigen (8.2%); Kinema Citrus (31.8%); Tokyo MX (10.06%)
- Website: bushiroad.com bushiroad.co.jp

Bushiroad Inc. (株式会社ブシロード, Kabushiki-gaisha Bushirōdo) is a Japanese entertainment company, producer of collectible card games and trading cards, and publisher of mobile apps and games, which was founded in 2007 by Takaaki Kidani and is headquartered in Tokyo. Bushiroad created and owns various media franchises such as Tantei Opera Milky Holmes. Since 2019, Bushiroad is listed on the Tokyo Stock Exchange and has traded on the TSE since its launch on July 24, 2019.

== Histoy ==
On January 29, 2012, Bushiroad announced that it had fully acquired New Japan Pro-Wrestling, a major professional wrestling promotion, for ¥500 million. In October 2019, Bushiroad acquired World Wonder Ring Stardom, a joshi puroresu promotion. In May 2026, Bushiroad announced that it would sell its ownership of New Japan Pro-Wrestling to TV Asahi and CyberAgent; with the deal being finalized at the end of June.

At the 2012 Tokyo Game Show, Bushiroad announced Bushimo, a new social gaming platform for smartphones, which was released in Winter 2012.

In March 2013, Bushiroad announced the revival of the media franchise Neppu Kairiku Bushi Road, with an anime television series that aired on December 31, 2013, as a collaboration between Bushiroad, Bandai Visual, Nitroplus, and Kinema Citrus.

Bushiroad introduced a monthly magazine in September 2013 titled Monthly Bushiroad (月刊ブシロード, Gekkan Bushirōdo). It features manga serializations of their various trading card games and other franchises.

Bushiroad created the media franchise BanG Dream! in January 2015, which consists of a musical group, several manga series, and an anime television series. It also created the media franchise Shōjo Kageki Revue Starlight in 2017, which consists of a musical and an anime television series.

On December 12, 2019, Bushiroad and Kadokawa each acquired 31.8% of Kinema Citrus. The three companies previously announced a partnership in the same year for the creation of different anime, and one of the reasons for the deal was due to that partnership and a day later Bushiroad announced that it had acquired 8.2% of Sanzigen with Ultra Super Pictures owning 75.4% of Sanzigen and studio president Hiroaki Matsuura owning 16.4% of the company. On March 16, 2021, Bushiroad acquired a 50.625% controlling stake in video game company Frontwing.

== Overview ==
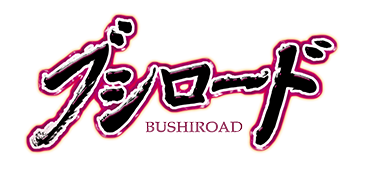
Logo (2007–2017)

In the beginning, the company was associated with six distinct subgroups that later merged into one entity. The two most important companies that extended the company's global market were in subsidiary which was created on November 12, 2010, to expand the company to market overseas for Collectible card games. On May 18, 2012, Bushiroad set up a subsidiary called Bushiroad USA Inc., which is located in Los Angeles, California to help them demand and increased interest in the company in those markets. The company also has large number of stores offering its products in Australia, Canada, China, France, Germany, United Kingdom, Colombia, Brazil, Argentina, Indonesia, Singapore, Thailand, Malaysia, New Zealand, India, Italy, Turkey, Qatar, Philippines, Spain, Portugal, Cambodia, Panama, Uruguay, Peru, Paraguay, Mexico, South Africa, and Hong Kong.

- Bushiroad Creative, Inc.

On February 27, 2015, Bushiroad formed a subsidiary to help the company with the trading sales. In May 2016 Bushiroad change the name of Alcard Co., Ltd. to Bushiroad Creative and is currently headed by Kosuke Narita and they moved their headquarters from Warabi, Saitama to Nakano, Tokyo. The company also helps the main company with Merchandising sales.

- Bushiroad Move, Inc.

Formerly known as Bushiroad Media, Bushiroad Move specializes in internet radio production and also manages the voice acting agency, HiBiKi, along with HiBiKi Radio Station, which is dedicated to promoting Bushiroad's anime, games, and voice talents.

- Bushiroad Music, Inc.

Operates a music business and handles activities such as the planning, production and sales of music contents. Bushiroad Music is also highly involved in the production of live events.

- Bushiroad Music Publishing Inc.

Bushiroad Music Publishing is a wing of the Bushiroad Music tasked with handling the copyright, development, and publishing of musical works.

- Bushiroad International Pte., Inc.
- Bushiroad USA, Inc.
- Bushiroad Works, Inc.

Bushiroad Works, Inc. was established to create and publish original IP through manga and novel format.

- World Wonder Ring Stardom

Stardom is a joshi wrestling promotion brought by Bushiroad in October 2019. Originally operated under as Bushiroad Fight Co., Ltd. until 2024 and was briefy a subsidiary of the then Bushiroad owned promotion New Japan Pro-Wrestling.

=== Bushiroad Well-Be ===
Bushiroad Well-Be
- Type: Subsidiary
- Industry: Theater
- Genre: Fitness
- Founded: October 7, 2004
- Founder: Takashi Oba
- Headquarters: Hokkaido, Japan
- Key people: Takashi Oba (Representative Director)
- Services: licensing
- Number of employees: 256 (2022)
- Parent: Bushiroad
- Subsidiaries: Thearter Company HIKOSEN
- Website: https://bushiroad-wellbe.com/

Bushiroad Well-Be is a subsidiary of Bushiroad that owns fitness clubs and theaters and was founded in 2004.

Bushiroad would acquire 14.5% of the shares in 2019 and then later on October 1, 2019, for the purpose of forming a tie-up with the companies' subsidiary theater company Thearter Company HIKOSEN. Furthermore, on February 3, 2020, Bushiroad would acquire all shares of the company made a wholly owned subsidiary.

== Games and products ==
=== Multimedia franchises ===
Those are original crossmedia projects of the company that are made available on different media like manga, anime, games and live events.

- Tantei Opera Milky Holmes

Beginning in 2010, it has a voice actor unit for live performances, an anime, light novel, manga and games.

- BanG Dream!

Created in 2015, it has an anime, manga, a mobile game and bands made up by the voice actors of the characters which perform in live events with instruments and also launch music albums and singles. A male-centric version titled From Argonavis launched in 2018.

- Revue Starlight

Beginning in 2017, it has a unit with voice actors for musicals, an anime, manga, a radio program and a mobile game.

- D4DJ

Beginning in 2019, it has an anime, a game, and live DJ performances.

- Zero Rise

Beginning in 2026, it has an anime and a stage play.

=== Collectible card games ===
- AlicexCross
- Cardfight!! Vanguard
- ChaosTCG
- Dragoborne -Rise to Supremacy-
- Five Qross
- Future Card Buddyfight
- Jewelpet Trading Card Game
- King of Pro-Wrestling
- Rebirth for you
- Luck & Logic
- Monster Collection
- Palworld
- Shadowverse: Evolve
- Victory Spark
- Weekly Shonen Sunday V.S. Weekly Shonen Magazine
- Weiß Schwarz

=== Published video games ===
Published games through their Bushimo social smartphone gaming service:

- BanG Dream! Girls Band Party!
- Case Closed Runner: Race to the Truth
- Crayon Shin-chan: The Storm Called! Flaming Kasukabe Runner!
- Chaos Online
- Tantei Opera Milky Holmes
- Tap Logic ～TAP! Luck & Logic～
- Senki Zesshō Symphogear XD Unlimited
- The Prince of Tennis Rising Beat
- Click! Kaitou Teikoku
- Bound Monsters
- Ren'ai Replay
- Kindan Shoukan! Summon Monster
- Love Live! School Idol Festival
- Love Live! School Idol Festival All Stars
- KamiKari: Demons x Trigger
- Dragon Strike
- Kemono Friends Pavilion
- Cardcaptor Sakura Happiness Memories
- Cardfight!! Online (cancelled project)
- Shōjo Kageki Revue Starlight: Re LIVE
- Miss Kobayashi's Dragon Maid: Burst Forth!! Choro-gon Breath

=== Acquisitions ===
- Neppu Kairiku Bushi Road
- World Wonder Ring Stardom (Acquired from Rossy Ogawa)
- Sanzigen (8.2%)
- Kinema Citrus (31.8%)
- Sopratico (Acquired from Takashi Oba)
- Frontwing (50.625%)
- Tokyo MX (10.06%)

==== Former ====
- New Japan Pro-Wrestling (Acquired from Yuke's in 2012, sold to TV Asahi and CyberAgent in June 2026)

== See also ==
- Joran: The Princess of Snow and Blood
