= Tantei Opera Milky Holmes =

Japanese media franchise

- Cover of first BD/DVD volume of the anime television series. From left to right: Sherlock Shellingford (with Kamaboko), Nero Yuzurizaki, Cordelia Glauca and Hercule Barton.

探偵オペラ ミルキィホームズ (Tantei Opera Mirukī Hōmuzu)
- Genre: Comedy, detective
- Manga
- Written by: Bushiroad
- Illustrated by: Sorahiro Mizushima
- Published by: Kadokawa Shoten
- Magazine: Comp Ace
- Original run: May 2010 – January 2011
- Volumes: 2
- Anime television series
- Directed by: Makoto Moriwaki
- Written by: Kazuyuki Fudeyasu
- Music by: Katsumichi Harada
- Studio: J.C.Staff
- Original network: Tokyo MX
- Original run: October 7, 2010 – December 23, 2010
- Episodes: 12 (+1 special)
- Video game
- Developer: Artdink
- Publisher: Bushiroad
- Genre: Adventure
- Engine: PlayStation Portable
- Released: JP: December 16, 2010
- Light novel

Tantei Opera Milky Holmes: Overture
- Written by: Hideaki Koyasu
- Illustrated by: Natsuki Tanihara; Keiichi Ishikura
- Published by: ASCII Media Works
- Imprint: Dengeki Bunko
- Published: December 10, 2010
- Anime television series

Tantei Opera Milky Holmes: Act 2
- Directed by: Makoto Moriwaki
- Written by: Kazuyuki Fudeyasu
- Music by: Monaca: Satoru Inohara
- Studio: J.C.Staff; Artland
- Original network: Tokyo MX
- Original run: January 5, 2012 – March 22, 2012
- Episodes: 12
- Video game

Tantei Opera Milky Holmes 2
- Developer: Artdink
- Publisher: Bushiroad
- Genre: Adventure
- Platform: PlayStation Portable
- Released: JP: August 23, 2012
- Original video animation

Tantei Opera Milky Holmes Alternative
- Directed by: Yoshiaki Iwasaki
- Written by: Takayo Ikami
- Music by: Monaca: Satoru Inohara
- Studio: J.C.Staff; Artland
- Released: August 25, 2012 – December 31, 2012
- Runtime: 24 minutes
- Episodes: 2
- Anime television series

Futari wa Milky Holmes
- Directed by: Hiroshi Nishikiori
- Written by: Hideki Shirane
- Music by: Jun Ichikawa
- Studio: J.C.Staff; Nomad
- Original network: Tokyo MX
- Original run: July 13, 2013 – September 28, 2013
- Episodes: 12
- Anime television series

Tantei Kageki Milky Holmes TD
- Directed by: Hiroshi Nishikiori
- Written by: Tenga Komuro
- Music by: Elements Garden: Noriyasu Agematsu; Daisuke Kikuta
- Studio: J.C.Staff; Nomad
- Original network: Tokyo MX
- Original run: January 4, 2015 – March 28, 2015
- Episodes: 12
- Anime film

Tantei Opera Milky Holmes the Movie: Milky Holmes' Counterattack
- Directed by: Makoto Moriwaki (Chief); Hiroaki Sakurai
- Written by: Kazuyuki Fudeyasu
- Music by: Elements Garden
- Studio: J.C.Staff
- Released: February 27, 2016
- icon

Tantei Opera Milky Holmes (Japanese: 探偵オペラ ミルキィホームズ, Hepburn: Tantei Opera Mirukii Hōmuzu; lit. "Detective Opera Milky Holmes") is a media franchise owned by the Japanese entertainment company Bushiroad. The first release was an Internet radio drama, released in December 2009. An anime adaptation by J.C.Staff aired between October and December 2010, with a special episode aired on August 26, 2011. The second anime season aired between January and March 2012 with another special aired on August 25, 2012. A third series, titled Futari wa Milky Holmes, aired between July and September 2013. A fourth series titled Tantei Kageki Milky Holmes TD aired between January and March 2015. Other media includes a manga adaptation serialized in Comp Ace between May 2010 and January 2011; two visual novels, released for the PlayStation Portable in December 2010 and August 2012 respectively; a trading card game tie-in with Bushiroad's Weiß Schwarz; and a light novel series published by ASCII Media Works under its Dengeki Bunko label.

The series is an homage to the detective fiction genre, with four young girls named after famous fictional detectives: Sherlock Holmes, Nero Wolfe, Hercule Poirot and Cordelia Gray. Milky Holmes is also the name of a voice acting unit consisting of the series' four main voice actresses: Suzuko Mimori, Sora Tokui, Mikoi Sasaki and Izumi Kitta.

== Plot ==
Set in the near future in the Great Era of Detectives, chosen people are born with supernatural abilities known as Toys (トイズ, Toizu). Those who use these Toys for evil are responsible for a wave of crimes and necessitate employing Toy-using detectives to help solve them. In the Yokohama District, Opera Kobayashi runs a detective agency named Milky Holmes, made up of four budding young detectives, Sherlock Shellingford, Nero Yuzurizaki, Hercule Barton and Cordelia Glauca, who each wield their own unique toys and train to become detectives at Holmes Detective Academy.

The video game casts players in the role of Kobayashi, who must utilise Milky Holmes' unique abilities to stop the Thieves' Empire, a band of thieves led by the mysterious Arséne. The second puts players in the role of another detective, Ellery Himeyuri. The Alternative TV specials also take place in this universe, in which Kobayashi and Milky Holmes are assisted by another Toy user, Lily Adler, in fighting against the Thieves' Empire whilst visiting London.

In the first two anime television series, the four girls of Milky Holmes, Sherlock, Nero, Hercule and Cordelia, end up losing their Toys during an encounter with the Thieves' Empire. Taken away from their rich lifestyle and thrown into an attic, the girls must try to regain use of their Toys or else face expulsion from Holmes Detective Academy. Futari wa Milky Holmes, which takes place two years after the other series, follows two young girls, Alice and Kazumi, who, inspired by Milky Holmes, form their own detective unit, Feathers, and fight against a group of thieves known as the Color the Phantom. Tantei Kageki Milky Holmes TD sees Milky Holmes help an idol named Marine Amagi recover her Toys, the seven Elements, which have been stolen from her.

== Media ==
=== Manga ===
A manga adaptation illustrated by Sorahiro Mizushima was serialized in Kadokawa Shoten's Comp Ace magazine between May 2010 and January 2011 and was published into two tankōbon volumes.

=== Anime ===
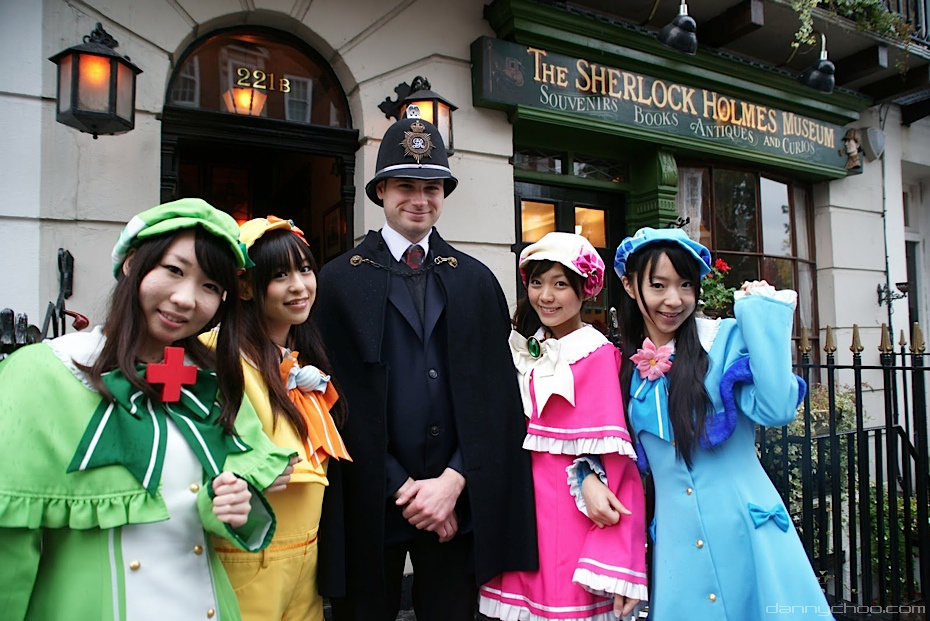
The voice actresses of Milky Holmes, at the Sherlock Holmes Museum in London. From left to right: Mikoi Sasaki, Sora Tokui, Suzuko Mimori, Izumi Kitta

An anime adaptation of Tantei Opera Milky Holmes by J.C. Staff aired between October 7, 2010, and December 23, 2010, and was also streamed by Crunchyroll. A special episode aired in August 2011. A second anime season co-produced between J.C.Staff and Artland, titled Tantei Opera Milky Holmes: Act 2 (探偵オペラ ミルキィホームズ 第2幕, Tantei Opera Miruki Hōmuzu Dai-ni Maku) aired in Japan from January 5, 2012, to March 23, 2012, and was streamed by Nico Nico. A third season, titled Futari wa Milky Holmes (ふたりはミルキィホームズ; lit. The Two of Us are Milky Holmes), co-produced with Nomad, aired between July 13, 2013, and September 28, 2013, alongside live action segments featuring the cast. The series is set two years following the other series and focuses on a new pair of protagonists. A fourth series titled Tantei Kageki Milky Holmes TD (探偵歌劇ミルキィホームズTD) began airing on Tokyo MX began airing in January 2015.

A TV special episode based on the PSP games, titled Tantei Opera Milky Holmes Alternative One ~Opera Kobayashi and the Five Paintings (探偵オペラ ミルキィホームズ Alternative ONE～小林オペラと5枚の絵画～, Tantei Opera Miruki Hōmuzu Alternative ONE ~Kobayashi Opera to Go-mai no Kaiga), was streamed on Nico Nico Douga between August 19 and August 25, 2012, before airing on Tokyo MX on August 25, 2012. A follow-up special, Tantei Opera Milky Holmes Alternative Two ~Opera Kobayashi and the Raven of the Empty Sky~ (探偵オペラ ミルキィホームズ Alternative TWO ～小林オペラと虚空の大鴉, Tantei Opera Miruki Hōmuzu Alternative TWO ~Kobayashi Opera to Kokū no Ōgarasu~), was announced and both Alternative episodes were released on Blu-ray and DVD on January 9, 2013. A new anime series will premiere in December 2016.

=== Music ===
For the first season, the opening theme is "Seikai wa Hitotsu! Janai!!" (正解はひとつ!じゃない!!, The Answer is One! Not!!) by Milky Holmes (Suzuko Mimori, Izumi Kitta, Sora Tokui and Mikoi Sasaki), while the ending theme is "Honnō no Doubt" (本能のDOUBT, Instint Doubt) by Faylan. The ending theme for the TV special is "Party Party!" (パーティーパーティー!, Pātī Pātī!) by Milky Holmes. For the second series, the opening theme is "Nazo! Nazo? Happiness!!" (ナゾ！ナゾ？Happiness!!, Mystery! Mystery? Happiness!) by Milky Holmes while the ending theme is "Lovely Girls Anthem" by Natsuko Aso. For Futari wa Milky Holmes, the opening theme is "Glory Glowing☆Days" (ぐろーりーぐろーいん☆DAYS, Gurōri Gurōin Deizu) by Milky Holmes while the ending theme is "Seishun Beginner!" (セイシュンビギナー!, Youthful Beginner!) by Milky Holmes Feathers (Ayasa Itō and Aimi Terakawa). For Milky Holmes TD, the opening theme is "Milky A Go Go" (ミルキィ A GO GO) by Milky Holmes, while the ending theme is "Tankyū Dreaming" (探求Dreaming, Exploration Dreaming) by Emi Nitta.

A maxi single, Colorful Garden, was released on April 6, 2011.

=== Video games ===
Box art of the video game for the PSP

A visual novel developed by Bushiroad was released on PlayStation Portable on December 16, 2010. Players play the role of Opera Kobayashi, who must train Milky Holmes to be great detectives and use their abilities to stop thieves. The game's second chapter, Tantei Opera Milky Holmes 1.5 was released on September 29, 2011, from the PlayStation Store. A sequel, Tantei Opera Milky Holmes 2, was released on August 23, 2012, casting players in the role of a new protagonist named Ellery Himeyuri. A new music-based video game based on the animated series was announced by Bushiroad in July 2013 for release in 2014.

=== Other appearances ===
The four main characters of Milky Holmes appear briefly in many different episodes of Cardfight!! Vanguard as cameos where they are simply shown in the background. The voice actresses also make a cameo as the Milky Holmes in episode 23 of Fire Leon, a live action series also produced by Bushiroad. In this scene, Suzuko Mimori portrays both Sherlock Shellingford and Yû Kusayanagi, a recurring character of the series. Additionally, the character "Sherlock "Sheryl" Shellingford" appears as a "guest" partner in the Japanese MMORPG Onigiri Online.

=== Movie ===
An idea of a movie adaptation was first teased in the form of clues hidden within the end cards of the delayed fifth episode of Tantei Kageki Milky Holmes TD for fans to solve. Tokyo MX, TV Kanagawa, Hokuriku Broadcasting, TV Aichi and Sun TV aired the same episode in different regions, but showed a different pair of letters in the end card, which when rearranged vertically could be read as "Milky Movie". A leak also emerged from the Japanese retail website Gamers' listing for the April issue of Monthly Bushiroad magazine, which included an image sample of a bundled publicity image extra which said "Milky Holmes movie adaptation planning start!!" The image has since been taken down from the website. The existence of the project was officially revealed later in a special edition of Miru Miru Milky, a variety show starring the main voice actors, and confirmed by the Milky Holmes official website the next day. However, it was also announced that they need support from the fans to realize its production, meaning the project hasn't gotten greenlit for production yet.
