= Miss Monochrome =

Character created by Yui Horie

- Promotional poster, featuring main characters

ミス・モノクローム (Misu Monokurōmu)
- Genre: Idol, science fiction, slice of life
- Anime television series
- Directed by: Yoshiaki Iwasaki
- Written by: Kazuyuki Fudeyasu
- Music by: Shigenobu Ōkawa
- Studio: Liden Films; Sanzigen
- Licensed by: Crunchyroll
- Original network: TV Tokyo (S1); Tokyo MX AT-X, BS11 (S2-3)
- Original run: October 1, 2013 – December 18, 2015
- Episodes: 39 + 2 OVA
- Manga

Miss Monochrome -Motto Challenge-
- Written by: Kazuyuki Fudeyasu
- Illustrated by: Nana Tōno
- Published by: Kodansha
- Magazine: Good! Afternoon
- Original run: January 29, 2014 – September 5, 2014
- Volumes: 1
- icon

Miss Monochrome (Japanese: ミス・モノクローム, Hepburn: Misu Monokurōmu) is an original character created and voiced by Japanese singer and voice actress Yui Horie, first appearing as a 3D virtual singer in March 2012 at the concert The Adventure Over Yui Horie III ~Secret Mission Tour~ (堀江由衣をめぐる冒険III～Secret Mission Tour～, Horie Yui o Meguru Bōken III ~Secret Mission Tour~). A 13-episode anime television series by Liden Films aired in Japan between October and December 2013. A second season of the anime began airing from July 3, 2015. A manga series began serialization in Kodansha's Good! Afternoon magazine in January 2014.

== Characters ==
Miss Monochrome (ミス・モノクローム, Misu Monokurōmu)
Voiced by: Yui Horie, Takahiro Sakurai (Genderbent) (Japanese); Abby Trott (English)
An android aspiring to become an idol. She had been an admirer of Kikuko and naively thinks that by becoming a famous idol herself, she could meet Kikuko someday. She keeps herself charged using AA batteries, but installing it with different types can physically affect her. Miss Monochrome existed since the ancient human civilization, which was destroyed by an alien invasion. For once, out of curiosity, she installed the battery in the opposite pole, which in turn transform her into a male android Mister Monochrome (ミスター・モノクローム, Misutā Monokurōmu). Though gaining a larger popularity, she was embarrassed by the appearance until she reverted to her normal form.
Maneo (マネオ)
Voiced by: Keiji Fujiwara (Japanese); Keith Silverstein (English)
The manager of a convenience store who winds up as Miss Monochrome's idol manager simply due to his job title.
Kikuko
Voiced by: Kikuko Inoue (Japanese); Cristina Vee (English)
An idol for popular TV shows. She is the one who Miss Monochrome looks up to when she decided that she wanted to become an idol. It is implied that she was the reincarnation of Miss Monochrome's friend back in the ancient civilization after its destruction by an alien race. However, Monochrome has little memory of what happened in the past, due to waiting from that time diminishes her memory.
Mana (マナ)
Voiced by: Akemi Kanda (Japanese); Sandy Rojas (English)
Monochrome's caretaker who becomes Kikuko's manager after conning Miss Monochrome into handing over 19.3 billion yen worth of her fortune. She always manages to cover up the aforementioned scam every time Monochrome tries to bring it up.
Rū-chan (ルーちゃん)
Voiced by: Hiroshi Kamiya
Miss Monochrome's "pet" Roomba, which is powered by a built-in battery cell. He was initially speechless until the appearance of season 2. When Miss Monochrome installed herself with an energetic battery, it combined with her and allows her to gain additional energy boost, so much that it was able to destroy an entire alien invasion fleet.
Yayoi Konno (紺野 やよい, Konno Yayoi)
Voiced by: Kana Asumi
An employee at Heimin Records who becomes Miss Monochrome's promoter. Due to the Heimin Records suffered was at wit's end, she ended up participating in an illegal street race to relief her tension until she met Monochrome. While generally klutzy and a bit overambitious, when she gets behind the wheel of her car, a modified Mazda RX-7 FD3S, she turns into a boisterous speed demon. But nonetheless, she is dutiful in person and manages to perform her jobs quickly whenever anything was requested by Monochrome.
Akiko (あきこ)
Voiced by: Ayaka Suwa
An employee at Maneo's convenience store who is talented with the guitar. While initially chosen to become Miss Monochrome's guitarist, she ends up making her solo debut as an international superstar.
Caramel (キャラメル, Kyarameru)
Voiced by: Yui Horie, Akemi Kanda, Kana Asumi, and Atsuko Yamashita (Angela)
A rookie idol group who become Miss Monochrome's backup dancers. They are named after their voice actresses; Yui (ゆい), Akemi (あけみ), Kana (かな) and Atsuko (あつこ).
Aliens (宇宙人, Uchujin)
Voiced by: Taishi Murata
An alien race that had wiped an ancient human civilization which Monochrome comes from, they reappeared again in episode 3 but the entire army was obliterated by Monochrome after she charged herself with the EVOLUTA battery.
DJ Colorful (DJカラフル, Di Jei Karafuru)
Voiced by: Showtaro Morikubo
First introduced in episode 1 of season 3, he was a gas attendant until Monochrome hired him as her DJ.

== Media ==
=== Anime ===
Miss Monochrome: The Animation (ミス・モノクローム -The Animation-) was produced by Liden Films and aired on TV Tokyo between October 1 and December 24, 2013. Additionally, it was released by Niconico Channel, Bandai Channel, AT-X in Japan and by Crunchyroll for viewers outside Japan and Taiwan. An English dub of the series was released on Crunchyroll on July 21, 2015. The theme song is "Pokerface" (ポーカーフェイス, Pōkāfeisu) by Miss Monochrome (Yui Horie).

A second season began airing from July 3 to September 25, 2015. A third season began airing from October 2 to December 18, 2015 For both seasons, the opening and ending themes respectively are "Black or White?" and "Step by Step", both performed by Miss Monochrome. From episode 10 of season 3 onwards, the respective opening and ending themes are "Miss Monochrome Taisō" (ミス・モノクローム体操, Miss Monochrome Exercise) and "Kimi to Boku" (キミとボク, You and I) by Miss Monochrome.

=== Manga ===
A manga adaptation, titled Miss Monochrome -Motto Challenge- (ミス・モノクローム -Motto Challenge-, Misu Monokurōmu -Motto Challenge-), written by Kazuyuki Fudeyasu and illustrated by Nana Tōno, began serialization in the 40th issue of Kodansha's Good! Afternoon magazine on January 29, 2014.

=== Appearances in other media ===
Miss Monochrome makes various appearances in other series. She appears in the Girl Friend Beta smartphone game, as well as its 2014 anime adaptation. Towards the end of 2015, she became a playable character in the online RPG Shironeko Project as part of a collaboration event with COLOPL.

She also appears as an unlockable scout in Megadimension Neptunia VII.
