= Ultra Super Pictures =

Japanese holding company

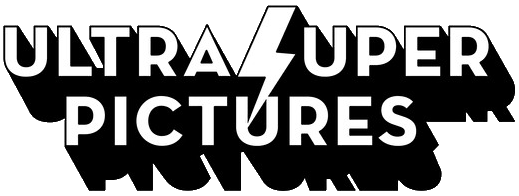

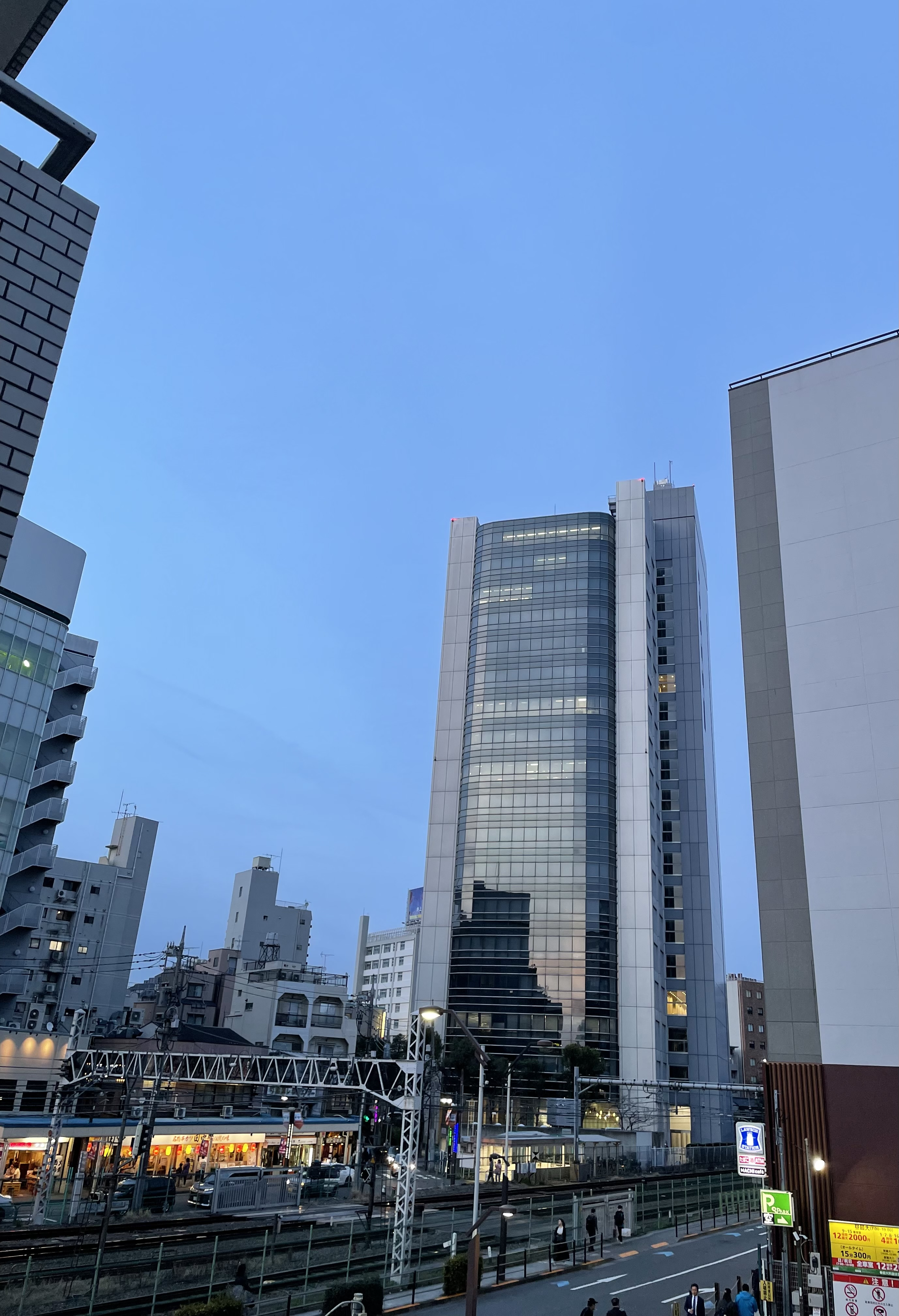
- Headquarters in Suginami, Tokyo
- Native name: 株式会社ウルトラスーパーピクチャーズ
- Romanized name: Kabushiki gaisha Urutora-sūpā-pikuchāzu
- Type: Kabushiki gaisha
- Industry: Anime (holding company)
- Founded: August 8, 2011; 15 years ago
- Founders: Hiroaki Matsuura; Daisuke Suzuki; Hiroshi Adachi; Shunsaku Nagura; Kentaro Shiga
- Headquarters: Kamiogi, Suginami, Tokyo, Japan
- Area served: Worldwide
- Key people: Hiroaki Matsuura (representative director); Daisuke Suzuki (director)
- Revenue: ¥210 million
- Subsidiaries: Sanzigen; Trigger; Liden Films
- Website: uspi.jp

Ultra Super Pictures (株式会社ウルトラスーパーピクチャーズ, Kabushiki gaisha Urutora-sūpā-pikuchāzu) is a Japanese joint holding company established in 2011 comprising animation studios Sanzigen, Ordet, Trigger, Liden Films, and Galaxy Graphics. They also co-own a part of ENGI, a studio established by Kadokawa in 2018.

== Member studios ==
- Sanzigen
- Trigger
- Liden Films

== Ultra Super Anime Time ==
In 2015 it was announced that Ultra Super Pictures would be producing a 30-minute anime block called Ultra Super Anime Time, airing on Tokyo MX and BS11 TV channels, starting from July 3, 2015. Ultra Super Sisters are navigation characters of the program composed of Supica (スピカ, Supika) and Sumaco (スマ子, Sumako) voiced by Kaori Ishihara and Yui Ogura respectively. The block features 3 short-length anime series, of which the following have been announced:

Summer 2015

- Miss Monochrome season 2
- Wooser's Hand-to-Mouth Life season 3
- Wakaba Girl

Fall 2015

- Miss Monochrome season 3
- Hacka Doll the Animation
- Kagewani

Winter 2016

- Please Tell Me! Galko-chan
- Sekkō Boys
- Tabi Machi Late Show (January only)
- Kono Danshi, Mahou ga Oshigoto Desu. (February only)
- Kanojo to Kanojo no Neko: Everything Flows (March only)

Spring 2016

- Space Patrol Luluco
- Puchimas! Petit Idolmaster (re-broadcast)
- Kagewani season 2

== Animated works ==
A list of works co-produced by Ultra Super Pictures.

- Harmonie (2014, animated by Studio Rikka)
- Monster Strike (2015–2016, animated by Studio Hibari)
- Monster Strike: Mermaid Rhapsody (2016, animated by Studio Hibari)
- Monster Strike: An Encore of Continuance- Pandora's Box (2016, animated by Studio Hibari)
- Monster Strike: Rain of Memories (2016, animated by Connect)
- Monster Strike The Movie (2016, animated by Liden Films)
