= Phantom in the Twilight =

2018 manga and anime series

- Promotional art for the series.
- Genre: Reverse harem
- Manga
- Written by: Haruta Mayuzumi
- Magazine: LINE Manga
- Original run: March 25, 2018 – present
- Anime television series
- Directed by: Kunihiro Mori
- Produced by: Nao Hirasawa; Takeshi Hagiwara; Mari Hoshino; Li Qingning
- Written by: Fumiaki Maruto; Shunsaku Yano
- Music by: TOMISIRO
- Studio: Liden Films (animation); Happy Elements (production)
- Licensed by: NA: Crunchyroll
- Original network: Tokyo MX, BS Fuji
- English network: SEA: Animax Asia
- Original run: July 10, 2018 – September 25, 2018
- Episodes: 12

Phantom in the Twilight is a Japanese and Chinese anime television series produced by the game developer Happy Elements and animated by the studio Liden Films. The series aired from July 10 to September 25, 2018. A manga adaptation was launched in March 2018.

== Synopsis ==
Set in modern-day London, the story takes place in a world where "Shadows" are born from human fear and anxiety. A young girl arrives to study abroad, only to be caught in a bizarre incident as she enters university. In a city with no acquaintances, the helpless girl wanders into "Café Forbidden", a mysterious café that exclusively opens at midnight. She meets an assortment of handsome men employed at the café, where guardians who protect the boundary between humans and shadow convene.

== Characters ==
Ton Baileu (バイルー・トン, Bairū Ton)
Voiced by: Kana Hanazawa
A Chinese student who refuses her parents' advice to go study abroad in the United Kingdom, she is the great-granddaughter of Sha Rijan. On her right hand, she wears a magical ring that is passed down by her great-grandma. She's strong-willed and determined in spite of many difficulties she deals with.
Vlad Garfunkel (ヴラッド・ガーファンクル, Vuraddo Gāfankuru)
Voiced by: Takahiro Sakurai
A Romanian vampire and descendant of Dracula, he carries many traits of a typical vampire like his ancestors. He has been accustomed to drinking human blood, before meeting Ton's great-grandmother, whom he vows not to drink more human blood. He's calculated, calm and strict with the duty he has followed.
Luke Bowen (ルーク・ボーエン, Rūku Bōen)
Voiced by: Nobuhiko Okamoto
A werewolf from Britain, he has a funny and relaxing attitude when talking to his friends. However, he has a hidden past where he uses to rampage his home village and reacts by emotions before meeting Vlad and Tauryu.
Tauryu (トウリュウ, Tōryū)
Voiced by: Tomokazu Sugita
An umbra created for self-destruction, his meeting with Sha Rijan helped change his heart. He's very loyal and will be very protective when it comes to Ton.
Wayne King (ウェイン・キング, Wein Kingu)
Voiced by: Daiki Yamashita
A living mannequin, he was originally a ghost before taking this mannequin form. He has another alternative side, a destructive umbra referred to as 'the lord of gluttony'.
Van Helsing (ヴァン・ヘルシング, Van Herushingu)
Voiced by: Rikiya Koyama
Not much information is known about him, except he's a 13th-generation descendant of Abraham Van Helsing. He is known to be very mean towards Umbras and very kind and loyal towards humans.
Haysin (ヘイシン, Heishin)
Voiced by: Junichi Suwabe
A powerful Taoist who creates Tauryu, he is a member of the "Midnight Sun" organization who wants to wipe out the Umbras, yet he is only treated as an outsider, much to his dismay. He orchestrates the kidnap of Mu Shinyao with the hope to force Ton to activate her power so he can suck her ability for his own ambition of eternal youth power. He's also a great-great-great uncle of Ton by surprise.
Chris Bowen (クリス・ボーエン, Kurisu Bōen)
Voiced by: Yūki Ono
The younger brother of Luke, whose relationship has been strained due to the village massacre caused by Luke in the past.
Shinyao Mu (ムー・シンヤオ, Mū Shinyao)
Voiced by: Manaka Iwami
She's Ton's closest friend and a carefree girl who easily accepts the existence of Umbras.
Backup (バックアップ, Bakkuappu)
Voiced by: Kousuke Toriumi
Rijan Sha (シャー・リージャン, Shā Rījan)
Voiced by: Yui Horie
George L. Gregory (ジョージ・L・グレゴリー, Jōji L Guregorī)
Voiced by: Kenji Nomura
A police inspector who works in the Scotland Yard, he belongs to the department related to umbra issues and has close relations with members in the Cafe Forbidden.

== Production, release and episode list ==
Mobile game company Happy Elements announced the original anime on March 25, 2018. The series is a Japanese and Chinese coproduction. The anime is directed by Kunihiro Mori and written by Fumiaki Maruto and Shunsaku Yano, with animation by studio Liden Films. Hidari designed the characters, and Megumi Yamashita adapted the designs for animation. Z-Ton provided the creature designs for the series. The series aired from July 10 to September 25, 2018, and broadcast on Tokyo MX and BS Fuji. Crunchyroll simulcasted the series.

No.	Title (Note: All English titles are taken from Crunchyroll.)	Original release date
1	"Those Who Live in the Twilight" "Tasogare ni Ikiru Mono" (黄昏に生きるもの)	July 10, 2018
Ton Baileu, who just came to London with her best friend, Shinyao Mu, got robbed upon arrival. In pursuit of the culprit, she wandered into Café Forbidden, which was founded by Ton's great grandmother. The three café workers, Vlad Garfunkel, Luke Bowen and Tauryu, along with Ton, set out to find the culprit. Upon finding the culprit, the café workers suddenly transformed into vampire, werewolf and Jiangshi. Ton was surprised. Moreover, she also discovered that the ring from her great grandmother that she always kept with her has a big secret.
2	"Shadows Who Fight Shadows" "Kage to Tatakau Kage-tachi" (影と戦う影たち)	July 17, 2018
Just as the thieving case was solved, Shinyao was kidnapped. To save her best friend, Ton visited Café Forbidden again. With the help of the fourth worker, the ghost Wayne King, and Detective George L. Gregory, the three café workers uncovered the truth. They also learned that the case had something to do with Umbra, the non-human entity, and the smartphone application "Magic Mirror". Ton waited for them to return. However, into her smartphone an information that Shinyao was in danger came. Alone, Ton headed out to save her best friend.
3	"Twisted Bond" "Nejiretakizuna" (ねじれた絆)	July 24, 2018
After defeating the Umbra Ripper, the group searched the building but found no trace of Shinyao. While searching for her friend, Ton learned that the four café workers were members of Twilight, an organization that aimed for coexistence between human and shadows and that Café Forbidden was its London Branch. Their search for Shinyao's whereabouts continued, but only Luke recognized the trace of the culprit. He went off in secret for the man who kidnapped Shinyao, and the one there was a young man he knew very well, Chris Bowen.
4	"Important Friends" "Taisetsuna Nakama" (大切な仲間)	July 31, 2018
Although Chris was asked by Haysin to kidnap Shinyao, he hid in a hideout to protect her. Meanwhile, while investigating the kidnapping Ton deepened her friendship with the members of Twilight. Ton then learned that there was a secret in the talisman on Tauryu the Jiangshi. The real form of Tauryu is an artificial weapon designed to destroy everything and blow himself after, which was activated by removing the talisman. Tauryu's creator, Haysin, trapped him to remove his Talisman and caused him to go out of control, but the Twilight tried to somehow stop him. Just when it seemed like they had run out of options, Ton tried to use the power of the ring to put a talisman on Tauryu.
5	"The Fairy's Lover" "Yōsei no koibito" (妖精の恋人)	August 7, 2018
Getting away from Haysin, Chris and Shinyao took refuge in an abandoned hospital and Chris began to feel more about Shinyao than just a person he kidnapped. Meanwhile, a beautiful woman named Lydia came to Café Forbidden, which Ton now inherit as manager. Lydia is an Umbra called Leannán-Sídhe, who should never have human lover. Unaware of this, Ton accepted her request to find a lover. Wayne found a person who met Lydia's preference for Ton. That person was Roland Lee, a very popular musician. Actually, he was Lydia's ex-boyfriend who still hadn't gotten over her. Roland then would come to the café to meet her.
6	"Midnight Sun" "Mayonaka no taiyō" (真夜中の太陽)	August 14, 2018
Thanks to Wayne's information gathering, the cafe members managed to locate Shinyao. However, the Midnight Sun, an organization that exterminates Umbra led by Van Helsing the 13th, caught Shinyao and Chris before them. Once again, Ton and the others were unable to save Shinyao. However, Van Helsing told Ton that he would give Shinyao back if she accepted his conditions. The condition was that for Ton to cut off all contact with Umbra and forget about the incident. Ton was uncertain of Van Helsing's words. That night, Ton left the Café.
7	"Awakening of the Century" "Hyakunenme no kakusei" (百年目の覚醒)	August 21, 2018
Ton and Shinyao were reunited and tried to return to the café, but they were prisoned in their room. With Wayne's help, they were able to escape but he was trapped inside the PC by Backup, the developer of "Magic Mirror". While Vlad and Van Helsing were engaged in battle, Haysin appeared in front of the escaping Ton and Shinyao. After telling Ton that he was the mastermind behind the series of events, Haysin used an Umbra to pierce Shinyao. Seeing Shinyao fell from the building, driven by shock Ton utilized the power of the ring to an outburst.
8	"The Price of Power" "Chikara no daishō" (力の代償)	August 28, 2018
Ton collapsed after her power outburst. A few days later she finally woke up, but because she used too much of her ring's power, she lost her memories of "Shinyao". Was it better for her to regain her memories, use her power again in the fight for her best friend or to let her memories lost and let her live normally? The members of Twilights were worried of Ton's happiness and each of them revealed their thoughts to her. Meanwhile, Shinyao who survived was running away from the Midnight Sun's chase with Chris. Backup, who had been keeping an eye on the two, noticed that Shinyao had a unique ability. Haysin also took interest in it, and Backup then proposed for a "game".
9	"The Pursued and The Protector" "Owareru-sha to mamoru mono" (追われる者と守る者)	September 4, 2018
The café members, Shinyao and Chris promised to meet up secretly to elude the Midnight Sun, which had their eyes on the whole city. At the same time, the "game" between Haysin and Backup began. It was a game to see who would awaken to power first: Haysin with his Ton, and Backup with his Shinyao. Ton approached Shinyao, eluding the pursuer, but was blocked by the powerful Umbra Haysin unleashed on the city, forcing her to choose between Shinyao and the city's inhabitant. In the meantime, despite everyone's effort, Shinyao was captured by mercenaries controlled by Backup and Chris fell into the river after being struck by silver bullets.
10	"The Day Before Everything Ends" "Subete ga owaru ichi-nichi mae" (すべてが終わる一日前)	September 11, 2018
The "Magic Mirror" application that solves people's problem is actually an application to manipulate human. Shinyao, falling in the hand of the developer of said application, Backup, was found to be capable of absorbing Umbra and making their power hers. Backup and Haysin, after the success of the experiment, did one last game with Shinyao and Ton on the line. Meanwhile, the café members gathering in their hide out made up their mind about the final battle. That is to let Ton meet Shinyao still in her human form. However, Ton who gradually turning into Umbra after getting the "Power", had shaken off Vlad's warning and planned to go save Shinyao.
11	"Final Battle in the Dark" "Kessen wa yami no naka" (決戦は闇の中)	September 18, 2018
Ton and the Twilight head to the Tower of London, the den of Umbra, to rescue Shinyao. They faced the countless Umbra prepared by Haysin for them. Wayne and Ton finally reached Shinyao, but she had already absorbed so many Umbra, she was altered. Shinyao attacked Ton, her best friend, without mercy. Wayne covered for Ton and took a blow himself. The one who came to save Ton from Shinyao's attack was the man who was supposed to be her enemy, Val Helsing. With Van Helsing's help, Ton managed to defeat Backup, but Shinyao who was under his control went haywire. Ton then used the "Last Power" to stop Shinyao.
12	"Shadows That Remain at Dawn" "Yoake ni kienu kage" (夜明けに消えぬ影)	September 25, 2018
Luke, Tauryu and Chris had to battle a giant golem that continuously regenerated itself with Haysin's life energy. Meanwhile, Ton learned that the only way to stop Shinyao was to destroy the device buried in her body. She tried, but to no avail. Just when she was about to give up, Vlad appeared and managed to remove the device from Shinyao. However, Ton who used up too much power during the battle was now already a step away from becoming an Umbra. While saying, "Come back to me", Vlad broke the long years of promise and moved his teeth closer to Ton's neck.

== Manga ==
Haruta Mayuzumi launched a manga adaptation of the series on LINE Manga on March 25, 2018.

== Reception ==
=== Previews ===
The anime series' first episode received generally positive reviews from Anime News Network's staff during the Summer 2018 season previews. While finding the overall plot awkwardly delivered and lacking development, James Beckett praised Ton Baileu as the main heroine, the male cast having solid rapport with one another and the action scenes they take place in, concluding that fans of otome video games will enjoy it. Theron Martin praised the execution of a "pretty straightforward reverse-harem premise", highlighting the characterization of Ton and her male harem, and both the animation and soundtrack that culminate into "a respectable production effort." Rebecca Silverman also commended Ton as a character and both the character designs and fight scenes but found the episode overall to be "a messy and over-stuffed affair", concluding that viewers will enjoy it if they accept the melodrama and unintentional humor. Nick Creamer was critical of the show's slow opening, animation and staying too close to their given genre with its story but gave praise to the overall execution with its main cast having chemistry, engaging fantasy setting and Ton being a more than capable heroine, concluding that "[I]f you're in the mood for a supernatural fantasy, it's definitely worth a look."

=== Series ===
Fellow ANN editor Christopher Farris reviewed the complete anime series. He also gave praise to Ton's leading presence carrying the show, along with the supernatural worldbuilding involving its cast of Twilights but found criticism in the off-model character art and a "general lack of complex, impressive animation" outside of the art direction and a few "battle-heavy" scenes in the final episodes that are hampered by lackluster villains, concluding that, "Even though most of its individual elements are pretty mediocre, Phantom in the Twilight isn't so difficult to recommend – there's enough strong material in here to elevate the show to "pleasant surprise" status, a good-enough romp worth watching if you have a craving for sexy supernatural boyfriends, and want a series that likely won't disappoint you." Conversely, Allen Moody from THEM Anime Reviews was critical of the Twilights' durability and nonexistent "sense of peril or concern" for their own safety, the "less elaborately choreographed" battles and Ton's story being "overused" from other vampire adaptations, but commended the series for its "attractive character art" and highlighted Tauryu and Wayne as "particularly interesting" amongst the cast, concluding with: "I just never got as emotionally engaged by the show, or its characters, as I would have liked, and I almost feel guilty about that; I really wanted to like this show more than I did. Maybe it was the derivative aspects, maybe it was the pacing, maybe it was something else I can't really articulate. It's a GOOD show; I just couldn't find it a GREAT show." Silverman placed the series at number three on her top 5 best anime list of 2018, praising the action-harem plot being carried by Ton's no-nonsense characterization and the male harem having distinct personalities from each other, concluding with, "Add in some nice attention to folklore and literature, and Phantom in the Twilight becomes the reverse harem show for people who don't like the genre or who want to see it do something new."
