= Please Put Them On, Takamine-san =

Japanese manga series

- First tankōbon volume cover, featuring Takane Takamine

履いてください、鷹峰さん (Haite Kudasai, Takamine-san)
- Genre: Romantic comedy; Science fiction
- Manga
- Written by: Yuichi Hiiragi
- Published by: Square Enix
- English publisher: NA: Yen Press
- Magazine: Monthly Gangan Joker
- Original run: January 22, 2019 – present
- Volumes: 11
- Anime television series
- Directed by: Tomoe Makino
- Written by: Yū Sato
- Music by: Takeshi Nakatsuka
- Studio: Liden Films
- Licensed by: Crunchyroll
- Original network: AT-X (uncensored); Tokyo MX, BS11, GBS, MTV, SUN, KBS Kyoto (censored)
- Original run: April 2, 2025 – June 18, 2025
- Episodes: 12
- icon

Please Put Them On, Takamine-san (Japanese: 履いてください、鷹峰さん, Hepburn: Haite Kudasai, Takamine-san) is a Japanese manga series written and illustrated by Yuichi Hiiragi. in Square Enix's shōnen manga magazine Monthly Gangan Joker since January 2019. The series has been collected in eleven tankōbon volumes as of February 2026. In North America, it is licensed by Yen Press. An anime television series adaptation produced by Liden Films aired from April to June 2025.

== Premise ==
One day, high school student Koushi Shirota catches the student council president and school madonna, Takane Takamine, changing her clothes. Later, when he notices that she received a 98 on her test result, she removes her panties, and he sees her receiving the result again, but this time with a perfect score. Takamine soon confronts Shirota and tells him that she has the ability to rewind time by taking off her underwear, which then disappears. However, because he saw her naked, he is able to go back in time with her. She then forces him to be her "closet" by replacing her underwear with fresh ones wherever she uses the power, and to keep it all a secret from others.

== Characters ==
Takane Takamine (鷹峰 高嶺, Takamine Takane)
Voiced by: Yurika Kubo
The student council president and madonna who is highly admired by her peers. She seems to be the perfect student, but this is because she has the ability to rewind time by removing an article of underwear so she can undo any mistakes she has made. She acquired the ability from a time in her childhood when she was so embarrassed that she wet herself.^{Ch. 1} It is later revealed she has harbored feelings for Shirota since they were young and were at a park taking care of a stray cat, which Takamine eventually adopted.^{Ch. 6, 12} Although she tends to be demanding at school, she acts more jokingly and flirtatiously with him whenever the two are alone, stating that Shirota is a perverted virgin who fantasizes about all sorts of sexual situations concerning her.^{Vol. 1}
Koushi Shirota (白田 孝志, Shirota Kōshi)
Voiced by: Daisuke Kasuya
A high school student who becomes involved with Takamine as her "closet", where he has to replace her underwear whenever she removes it. He is the only one who has seen Takamine naked and is thus able to go back in time whenever she has a do-over. At first, he did it because he did not want to be criminalized for appearing to have sexually assaulted Takamine.^{Ch. 1} He soon takes his task seriously to protect her from embarrassment and later reveals that he was unaware of her romantic intentions back then.^{Ch. 25}
Erie Evergreen (絵梨依・エバーグリーン, Erii Ebāgurīn) / Eri (エリ)
Voiced by: Sumire Uesaka
Shirota's childhood friend. She has blonde hair and works as an amateur model. They were friends in elementary school but went to different middle and high schools. She later joins Shirota at the same cram school. She likes hanging out with Shirota, which makes Takamine jealous, but she is actually a lesbian who has a girlfriend. She has a small attraction to Takamine because of the latter's big breasts. She immediately notices that Takamine likes Shirota, so she tries to help her along.^{Ch. 18–20}
Rurika Kurosaki (黒崎瑠理香, Kurosaki Rurika)
Voiced by: Miyu Tomita
Erie's girlfriend. She works part-time at a family restaurant.^{Ch. 20}

== Media ==
=== Manga ===
Please Put Them On, Takamine-san is written and illustrated by Yuichi Hiiragi. The series has been serialized in Square Enix's shōnen manga magazine Monthly Gangan Joker since its February 2019 issue, which was released on January 22, 2019. The series is set to end serialization on January 22, 2027. Square Enix has collected its chapters into individual tankōbon volumes. The first volume was published on September 21, 2019. As of February 20, 2026, eleven volumes have been published.

Yen Press began publishing it in English on April 6, 2021, after announcing that they had acquired the license at their New York Comic Con panel in 2020.

==== Volumes ====
No.	Original release date	Original ISBN	English release date	English ISBN
1	September 21, 2019	978-4-7575-6313-1	April 6, 2021	978-1-9753-2163-5
1. "Be my closet." (私のクローゼットになりなさい。, Watashi no Kurōzetto ni Narinasai.); 2. "Let me do it over until I'm satisfied." (満足するまでやり直させて。, Manzoku Suru Made Yarinaosa Sete.); 3. "Do you want to look or not?" (見たいか、見たくないか、教えてほしいの。, Mitai ka, Mitakunai ka, Oshiete Hoshii no.); 4. "I want you to say it out loud." (ちゃんと口にして欲しいの。, Chanto Kuchi ni Shite Hoshii no.); 5. "Thank you." (ありがとう, Arigatō); 6. "Don't be dull–be sensitive." (ドン感しないで、ビン感して。, Donkan Shinaide, Binkan Shite.)
High school student Koushi Shirota catches Takane Takamine, a model student in beauty and brains, changing her clothes. Later, when he notices that she received a test score of 98, he sees her take off her panties and then notices she is receiving the paper back with a perfect score. Afterwards Takamine confronts Shirota and tells him that she has the ability to rewind time by taking off her underwear, which then disappears. However, because he had seen her breasts, he is able to go back in time with her. She then demands him to be her "closet", that is, to replace her underwear with fresh ones whenever she uses her power. He refuses at first, but when she screams for help that she was sexually assaulted, and the police arrive to arrest him, Shirota is forced to accept the terms. The next day, Shirota struggles to replace Takamine's panties while she is reciting something in class. Takamine gets Shirota to observe her more carefully so he can anticipate when she will activate her ability. Takamine uses her ability to do over a swimming race. When Shirota forgets to return her underwear bag, he scrambles to look for her when she tells him she is going out jogging. Takamine visits Shirota's house when the latter has a cold.
2	January 22, 2020	978-4-7575-6477-0	November 23, 2021	978-1-9753-2165-9
7. "Give me something irreplaceable." (とり戻せないモノを頂戴。, Tori Modosenai Mono o Chōdai.); 8. "A taste of first place." (一番イイのを味わって, IchibanII no o Ajiwatte); 9. "Start again, and when we get there..." (ヤり直して、イきツイた先で..., Yarinaoshite, Iki Tsuita Saki de...); 10. "I don't want to do this over." (ヤリなおしたくなんか、ないわ。, Yarinaoshitaku Nanka, Nai wa.); 11. "I want you to make me go meow, meow." (あなたにニャンニャンさせてほしいニャン。, Anata ni Nyan Nyan sa Sete Hoshii Nyan); 12. "Tell me your memories." (思い出を話してほしいの。, Omoide o Hanashite Hoshii no.); Bonus: "No panties." (Note: This chapter is titled "No, Panty" in the Japanese version.)
Takamine takes Shirota underwear shopping. When Shirota has to do a school run with a better time, Takamine motivates him to try harder. Takamine takes Shirota around a festival while she is dressed in a yukata. When Shirota is on the verge of failing his classes, Takamine tries to withhold using her power for the day. Takamine invites Shirota to her place to study, but she puts on cat ears and flirtatiously acts like one. When it starts raining, Takamine has Shirota stay the night. Takamine and Shirota talk about men wearing skirts.
3	August 21, 2020	978-4-7575-6804-4	April 26, 2022	978-1-9753-3736-0
13. "Takane-san the dream wife." (新妻上手の高嶺さん, Niidzuma Jōzu no Takane-san); 14. "Let me wash your back, darling." (あなた、お背中流させて。, Anata, o Senaka Nagasa Sete.); 15. "To a place you can't yet see." (そこからじゃ見えないところまで, Soko Kara ja Mienai Tokoro Made); 16. "I want you to be ready." (覚悟しておいてほしいの, Kakugo Shite Oite Hoshii no); 17. "Don't get the wrong idea." (勘違いしないでもらえるかしら, Kanchigai Shinaide Moraeru Kashira); 18. "Why, you two seem awfully close." (仲、睦まじいご様子で, Naka, Mutsumajii go Yōsu de); 19. "Let me return the favor." (お返しをさせて頂戴, Okaeshi o Sasete Chōdai)
Continuing the stay over, Takamine wants to roleplay with Shirota as a newlywed couple, dressing herself in a naked apron, and later joining him in the bathroom to wash his back and hair. She later video calls him while showing off some daring lingerie. They visit a prospective college. Shirota observes Takamine having an off day where she makes a number of mistakes. Shirota reunites with his childhood friend Eri, who has turned into a really attractive model. Takamine finds the two at the park and confronts them about the relationship until Eri recognizes Takamine from childhood as well.
4	March 22, 2021	978-4-7575-7163-1	August 23, 2022	978-1-9753-4213-5
20. "Let me give you some advice." (ちょっと忠言させて, Chotto Chūgen Sasete); 21. "Let me overwrite that." (上書きさせて, Uwagaki Sasete); 22. "Let me do it!!" (私にヤらせなさい!!, Watashi ni Yarasenasai!!); 23. "Now, raise your hand." (さあ、手を挙げなさい, Sā, te o Agenasai); 24. "Here's a story about my friend." (友人の話をきいてほしいの。, Yūjin no Hanashi o Kiite Hoshii no.); 25. "Let me say it." (言わせてほしいの, Iwasete Hoshii no)
Eri invites Takamine and Shirota to a family restaurant. Takamine shares how Shirota was flirting with her, but Eri realizes it is probably the other way around, and after Shirota leaves, she apologizes to Takamine for appearing to flirt with Shirota, revealing that she already has a lover. Later, Takamine wants Shirota to play with water balloons like he had done with Eri. Takamine and Shirota have a date at the park. The class wants to do a Cinderella play with Takamine as the title character. She tries to get Shirota to volunteer himself to be the prince, but he loses to a popular guy named Seiya Ouji. After Shirota is sent out on an errand during their study session, Eri asks Takamine on how her relationship with Shirota is progressing; Takamine denies it and talks about her "friend" instead. Takamine and Shirota prepare for the play.
5	November 22, 2021	978-4-7575-7578-3	March 21, 2023	978-1-9753-5152-6
26. "Rainy days only make Shirota stronger." (雨降って白田固まる, Amefuri tte Shirota Katamaru); 27. "I'll give you a rehearsal." (予行演習をさせてあげるわ, Yokō Enshū o sa Sete Ageru wa); 28. "Just keep your eyes on me." (私だけを見なさい, Watashi Dake o mi Nasai); 29. "Hide the truth in your heart." (真実は心にしまって, Shinjitsu wa Kokoro ni Shimatte); 30. "Let me comfort you, Master." (ご主人様を癒して差し上げます, Goshujinsama o Iyashite Sashiagemasu); 31. "Don't make it so it never happened." (無かったことにしないで, Nakatta Koto ni Shinaide)
6	June 22, 2022	978-4-7575-7976-7	July 18, 2023	978-1-9753-6808-1
32. "Let me give you a reading." (リーディングさせて, Rīdingu sa Sete); 33. "Look carefully before answering." (よく見て答えてみなさい, Yoku Mite Kotaete mi Nasai); 34. "Let me see it with my Eternal, All-Seeing Eye." (見定めし穢れなき瞳で見させて, Misadameshi Kegarenaki Hitomi de mi Sasete); 35. "Let me do an experiment." (実験させて, Jikken sa Sete); 36. "Do you want to see it or not?" (見たい?見たくない?, Mitai? Mitakunai?); 37. "Do whatever you want." (好きにしていいわよ, Suki ni Shite ī wa yo); 38. "Get refreshed." (スッキリしといて, Sukkiri shi Toite); 39. "Grant my wish." (願いを叶えて, Negai o Kanaete)
7	March 22, 2023	978-4-7575-8477-8	January 23, 2024	978-1-9753-8779-2
40. "Look carefully." (よく御覧なさい, Yoku Goran'nasai); 41. "You're possessive, aren't you?" (独占欲が強いのね, Dokusen Yoku ga Tsuyoi no ne); 42. "Eat the correct one." (正解を食べなさい, Seikai o Tabe Nasai); 43. "Show me what you're hiding." (隠しごとを明かしなさい。, Kakushigoto o Akashi Nasai.); 44. "Shirota-kun's determination." (白田くんの決意, Shirota-kun no Ketsui); 45. "Don't get in the way." (邪魔をしないで, Jama o Shinaide); 46. "So you've noticed, Shirota-kun." (気付きましたね、白田くん, Kidzukimashita ne, Shirota-kun)
8	December 21, 2023	978-4-7575-8970-4	October 15, 2024	979-8-8554-0116-5
46.5: "A few days after that..." (あの日の後日に・・・, Ano ni no Gojitsu ni); Bonus Chapter: "Prez's finest clothing." (会長の一張羅, Kaichō no Itchōra); 47. "You're fired." (あなた、クビよ。, Anata, Kubi yo.); 48. "Gimme headpats." (なでなでして, Nade nade Shite); 49. "Tell me your type." (好みを教えなさい, Konomi o Oshie Nasai); 50. "What's all this about?" (どういうつもりなのかしら, Dōiu Tsumorina no Kashira); 51. "I want to ask you something." (聞きたいことがあるの, Kikitai Koto ga aru no)
9	August 21, 2024	978-4-7575-9368-8	June 24, 2025	979-8-8554-1603-9
52. "Let's make sure we have no regrets!" (悔いの残らないようにね!, Kui no Nokoranai yō ni ne!); 53. "I want to tell you about my friend." (友達の話を聞いてほしいの, Tomodachi no Hanashi o Kiite Hoshī no); 54. "Let me confide in you." (相談させて, Sōdan sa Sete); 55. "Tell me how it felt." (どうだったか言いなさい, Dōdatta ka ii Nasai); 56. "Try and hide it." (隠してみせなさい。, Kakushite mise Nasai.); 57. "I'll be waiting for you." (待っていてあげるわ, Matte ite Ageru wa)
10	March 22, 2025	978-4-7575-9762-4	February 24, 2026	979-8-8554-2664-9
58. "How about some group play?" (集団でいかせて, Shūdan de Ika Sete); 59. "Look to the present." (今を見よう, Ima o Miyou); 60. "I'll let you decide. " (あなたの意見で決めさせて, Anata no Iken de Kime Sasete); 61. "Let me experiment." (実験させて, Jikken sa Sete); 62. "Cast away..." (流されて…。, Nagasarete….); 63. "Let's stay like this, just you and me." (このまま、二人で───。, Kono Mama, Futari de───.)
11	February 20, 2026	978-4-301-00331-1	—	—
64. Tōnin Dōshi de, Dōzo. (当人同士で、どうぞ。); 65. Nozoka Sete Itadakimasu (除させていただきます); 66. Watashi ni Pantsu o Haka Sasete Kudasai (私にパンツを履かさせてください); 67. Reiwa Pantsu Hakase Gassen o Shinasai (令和パンツ履かせ合戦をしなさい); 68. Watashi no Atarashī Kurōzetto ni Narinasai (私の新クローゼットになりなさい); Bonus: Uketorasete Itadaku wa (受け取らせていただくわ)

=== Anime ===
An anime television series adaptation was announced on August 2, 2024. It was produced by Liden Films and directed by Tomoe Makino, with Yū Sato overseeing and writing scripts, Ryō Yamauchi and Maya Itō designing the characters and serving as chief animation directors, and Takeshi Nakatsuka composing the music. The series aired from April 2 to June 18, 2025, on AT-X and other networks. The opening theme song is "Baby Baby Baby", performed by Masami Okui with Bonjour Suzuki, while the ending theme song is "Hightail it", performed by Makoto Furukawa. Crunchyroll streamed the series.

==== Episodes ====
No.	Title	Directed by (Note: Production staff information is taken from the ending credits of each episode.)	Storyboarded by	Original release date
1	"Become My Closet"; Transliteration: "Watashi no Kurōzetto ni Narinasai." (Japanese: 私のクローゼットになりなさい。)	Tomoe Makino	Tomoe Makino	April 2, 2025
Takane Takamine is admired for her excellence in academics and sports and is voted student council president. Koushi Shirota on the other hand is a complete nobody. While Shirota is hiding out in the gym storage room, Takamine enters and changes her bra, causing the former to see her breasts. In their classroom, he witnesses Takamine take off her panties after getting a 98 on an exam. Suddenly, she has a 100 and Shirota is seemingly the only one to remember what happened. Takamine later demonstrates that when she takes off her underwear, she gains the ability to change the past. Due to what he saw previously, Shirota has gained the ability to perceive the changes she makes. The only drawback is whichever piece of underwear she removes will vanish. Therefore, she demands Shirota become her closet, carrying spare underwear for her and helping her change into it without anyone noticing. When Shirota tries to refuse, Takamine screams he is molesting her. To avoid being arrested, Shirota is forced to swear his loyalty. A satisfied Takamine uses her power to undo her accusation.
2	"Let Me Redo It Until I'm Satisfied."; Transliteration: "Manzoku Suru Made Yarinaosa Sete." (Japanese: 満足するまでやり直させて。)	Yoshinobu Kasai	Masayoshi Nishida	April 9, 2025
Takamine insists Shirota carry a bag of underwear at all times. During class, Takamine decides she did not like how she recited a poem, takes off her panties and recites it again to coincide with a dramatic gust of wind through the window. Shirota panics as he must get new panties onto Takamine. She throws an eraser on the floor, providing an excuse for him to kneel in front of her without anyone noticing. He soon realizes, however, that he did not push the panties all the way up. With the teacher asking students to collect paperwork, it is a matter of time before Takamine has to stand up. Shirota quickly collects Takamine's papers himself and pushes the panties up with his knee, catching her off guard. At the end of the day, she congratulates his success, suggesting he tried hard because he wants to be the only one allowed to see her underwear. Shirota then asks about the noise she made earlier, but she angrily denies it. Later that night, Takamine considers using more risqué panties, but decides Shirota is not ready for them yet.
3	"I Want You to Enjoy the Very Best"; Transliteration: "Ichiban Ii no o Ajiwatte" (Japanese: 一番イイのを味わって)	Kazuya Fujishiro	Manabu Yukawa	April 16, 2025
Shirota is confused when Takamine activates her ability until he realizes it was because he almost let her leave the classroom without him assisting her. Shirota soon falls downstairs following Takamine's reply to his response to him peeking at her. He eventually awakens and Takamine admits she respects him just a little bit for his honesty. Later, Takamine coaches his running club and uses her powers to help him complete the race in under 30 minutes, which only happened because Shirota did not want the others to see under her skirt. He is so pleased he accidentally goes home with Takamine's underwear bag. She texts him to remind him the bag also contains her sports bra, and torments him with risqué pictures of her jogging braless. He initially dismisses the situation until he realizes she might find herself in potential danger. Having been joking around, Takamine is pleasantly surprised when Shirota arrives at her location as he was worried about her. She is glad that she can rely on him, while Shirota is unusually happy he is the only person in the world she trusts.
4	"Don't Be Dense, Be Sharp."; Transliteration: "Donkan Shinaide, Binkan Shite." (Japanese: ドン感しないで、ビン感して。)	Yoshinobu Kasai	Masayoshi Nishida	April 23, 2025
Shirota is confused why Takamine reversed time for a swimming race she had already won in order to win it again. When he wonders how she did it, she teasingly reveals she removed one of the pasties she was wearing. Takamine takes Shirota underwear shopping and demands he choose for her. After hearing his explanation why he selected a pair of blue panties, a secretly happy Takamine drags him into yet another lingerie shop. The next day, Shirota has a fever so Takamine takes him home to care for him. Seeing how her teasing has upset him, she rewinds time to undo it. She then rewinds time again by taking her bra off, this time ensuring she had put on deodorant after gym class, and climbs into bed with him to share body heat. Shirota is surprised by how comforted he feels. While half asleep, he asks why she is occasionally so nice to him. Takamine recalls her lonely childhood until she met Shirota, who helped her rescue an orphaned kitten, which she still owns. It also frustrates her that he has not yet realizes he is special to her.
5	"I Want You to Make This Cat Purr, Meow."; Transliteration: "Anata ni Nyan Nyan sa Sete Hoshii Nyan." (Japanese: あなたにニャンニャンさせてほしいニャン。)	Tsuneo Suzuki	Masayoshi Nishida	April 30, 2025
Shirota realizes he has not finished several assignments. Throughout the day, he notices Takamine refusing to use her power, though this exhausts her. He insists she redo something to feel better and she agrees, but only if he removes her panties for her. To prevent this happening again, Takamine decides to help with his summer homework. At her home, Takamine wants to show Shirota her cat Kuro. Because Kuro is away, however, Takamine flirtatiously acts like a cat. A storm occurs so Takamine insists he stay overnight. Once Kuro returns, Takamine is disappointed Shirota does not recognize her. Irritated, she uses all the soap so he cannot take a shower, then sits in just a towel to torment him. Shirota abruptly remembers rescuing a cat with a girl who gave him a love confession he did not respond to. He has always wanted to apologize but never learned her name. Takamine feels hopeful until he asks if she knows who the girl is. When lightning strikes, Takamine is so scared her towel falls off and she jumps on Shirota naked. Secretly, she is glad to have an excuse to hug him.
6	"Honey, Let Me Wash Your Back."; Transliteration: "Anata, Osenaka Nagasa Sete." (Japanese: あなた、お背中流させて。)	JOL-chan	Hiroyuki Fukushima	May 7, 2025
Takamine suggests she and Shirota roleplay as newlyweds. Shirota panics when she cooks dinner naked, so she allows him to put panties on her, only to take them off again when he burns the food. She then teases him by offering to let him lick some stew off of her. After dinner, Shirota is shocked when Takamine joins him in a risqué bikini to wash his back and hair. Shirota struggles to ensure Takamine does not see his arousal, only to fail when he accidentally grabs her breast. Having seen it, Takamine becomes unexpectedly embarrassed. A few days later, Shirota helps Takamine with patrolling a local festival, ensuring students behave themselves. Takamine reveals she has no underwear under her yukata and insists he put some on in public. Takamine rewinds time several times to search different areas, but becomes more frustrated each time they find nothing. Realizing she often searches areas filled with couples, Shirota wonders if maybe she is expecting a confession from him and is rewinding time to give him multiple opportunities. After watching the fireworks, he blurts out that they are beautiful, which seems to please her, so she stops rewinding time.
7	"Even That Which Isn't Visible From There"; Transliteration: "Soko Kara ja Mienai Tokoro Made" (Japanese: そこからじゃ見えないところまで)	Kazuya Fujishiro	Masayoshi Nishida	May 14, 2025
Takamine decides to take Shirota to an open day at Aogaku University since if he is to remain her closet, he must attend the same university as her. At Aogaku, she is surprised Shirota has not decided what he wants to do in the future. Takamine asks the lecturer a question about Aogaku then rewinds time just so she can slightly reword her question. Shirota manages to replace her panties in the middle of the lecture hall. Takamine later admits that while she does not mind if they do separate things in the future, she needs to keep him busy as her closet for their last year of high school. They return to school the next day where Shirota realizes Takamine is having an off day. To prevent others from gaining the power to perceive her rewinding time, he quickly shields her breasts by grabbing them with his hands. Embarrassed, Takamine rewinds the entire day. Relieved Takamine is acting normally again, Shirota decides to get serious about his future, starting by attending cram school. There, he encounters a woman from his past.
8	"You Two Seem Quite Intimate"; Transliteration: "Naka, Mutsumajii go Yōsu de" (Japanese: 仲、睦まじいご様子で)	Shiba Canta	Masayoshi Nishida	May 21, 2025
The girl is Ellie Evergreen, Shirota's friend from elementary school. Ellie invites him to the playground to have a water balloon fight. However, when she gets wet, it becomes apparent she is not wearing a bra. Ellie is surprised Shirota is planning to go to college with a woman he is not dating and deduces that they must be in love with each other. By sheer bad luck, a furious Takamine suddenly arrives and confronts them. Ellie then invites her to join them but Takamine mistakes the balloons for condoms and believes they just invited her to a threesome, so she slaps Shirota. Ellie reveals she remembers Takamine from elementary school as well. Ellie apologizes to Takamine for getting too close to her boyfriend, which Takamine denies. Ellie leaves, promising to see Shirota at cram school. Takamine is touched Shirota is trying to get into college with her and offers to help him study. When he refuses, she rewinds time to demand he accept her help. She also insists he replace the underwear she just removed. Whilst studying, Takamine realizes Shirota is such a bad student even cram school might not get him into college.
9	"Let Me Do It!!"; Transliteration: "Watashi ni Yarasenasai!!" (Japanese: 私にヤらせなさい！！)	Satoshi Toba	Hiroyuki Fukushima	May 28, 2025
Takamine, Ellie, and Shirota head to a restaurant where Ellie's friend Rurika Kurosaki works at. There, Takamine not-so-subtly references what previously happened between herself and Shirota at her house, but Ellie misinterprets it. Takamine and Ellie soon have a private conversation where the latter apologizes to the former for getting close to Shirota, revealing Rurika is actually her girlfriend. A relieved Takamine returns to Shirota and insists they have a water balloon fight. As a penalty for losing, Takamine demands Shirota lick sweat from her body. Ultimately picking her stomach, he realizes that he is actively going to do it. Afterward, Takamine finds Shirota has passed out, so she rewinds time. Takamine later invites him to a leisure park. During the outing, however, she keeps rewinding time for various reasons. Shirota is eventually shocked when he notices that she actually put her panties on herself at one point. She admits the trip was supposed to be his reward for cram school, but he kept making the day fun for her instead. When Shirota reveals that he planned everything in advance for that very reason, Takamine is secretly happy.
10	"It Rains, and Shirota Freezes Up"; Transliteration: "Amefuri tte Shirota Katamaru" (Japanese: 雨降って白田固まる)	Aoi Shingo	Masae Nakayama	June 4, 2025
During a study session at Takamine's house, Takamine asks Shirota to go to the store after Ellie touches her breast. While Shirota is away, Ellie wonders if he and Takamine are dating, which the latter denies. She then claims her "friend" is having trouble getting the guy she likes to notice her. Ellie proceeds to give some helpful advice. When Shirota returns, he erroneously believes Takamine and Ellie are having sex. Several days later, Takamine proposes a bet to Shirota where he has to determine which undergarment she removed. After a while, he incorrectly guesses her bra. At school, the class is preparing to do a Cinderella play for the upcoming culture festival. Once Takamine is awarded the lead role, Shirota volunteers to work in the sound crew. An annoyed Takamine uses her power and has him join her where she rubs her butt against him as a way to entice him to volunteer to play the role of the prince. When a classmate named Seiya Ouji volunteers, a concerned Shirota is finally motivated to do so as well.
11	"I'll Let You Do a Dry Run"; Transliteration: "Yokō Enshū o sa Sete Ageru wa" (Japanese: 予行演習をさせてあげるわ)	Daisuke Shimamura	Daisuke Shimamura	June 11, 2025
Ouji wins the role of the prince by a landslide, while Shirota is given the role of the prince's guard. The day before the play, the class begin final preparations. Takamine uses her power after Shirota experiences a couple of mishaps while he is working on the set. She is then asked to help out before Shirota can properly put on her panties, though she is able to adjust them without anyone noticing. That night, Takamine attempts to confess her feelings to Shirota while they are alone on the roof. However, he misinterprets the situation once she sneezes. The next day, they head inside a haunted house where a scared Takamine uses her power twice before she gets tangled up, which causes Shirota to quickly improvise to ensure that nobody else sees her naked body. When they return to the classroom, they learn that Ouji has not arrive yet. Just then, he appears and reveals he was injured by truck. As a result, Takamine has Shirota fill in for Ouji.
12	"Only Look At Me"; Transliteration: "Watashi Dake o Minasai" (Japanese: 私だけをみなさい)	JOL-chan	Hideyo Yamamoto	June 18, 2025
The play commences with Takamine on stage while Shirota nervously reads his lines. Once it is finally his turn, he suffers a severe case of stage fright, which causes Takamine to use her power. Backstage, she advises him to only look at her. Her words allow Shirota to overcome his issues. During a solo, Shirota puts panties on Takamine thanks to her dress being long enough where nobody can see what he is doing. When they reach the climax, Ouji suddenly appears and rants about how he is the real prince, forcing everyone to improvise. Shirota soon realizes the only reason why Ouji wants to be the prince is due to a selfish desire to touch Takamine's feet. When he vows that he will not let Ouji have her because he is the one who is going to make her happy, an elated Takamine kisses him. Afterward, the play is deemed a success. That night, Takamine uses her power when Shirota incorrectly guesses why she kissed him. After he puts another pair of panties on her, Shirota hopes their relationship will continue.

== Reception ==
Rebecca Silverman of Anime News Network gave the first manga volume 2 out of 5 stars, criticizing the writing for at times being mean-spirited, but otherwise enjoyed the ludicrous factor and the fan service artwork. Lynzee Loveridge rated it a "No thanks". She acknowledged that she initially appreciated the silly and comedic aspects of the story until the false rape allegation occurred, stating "I can get sexy lady fanservice of all stripes without the loaded baggage of this shit".

In June 2021, Please Put Them On, Takamine-san was nominated for the seventh Next Manga Award in the Best Printed Manga category.

== Notes ==
- "Ch." is shortened form for chapter and refers to a chapter number of the manga.
