= Monster Strike (TV series) =

Anime franchise

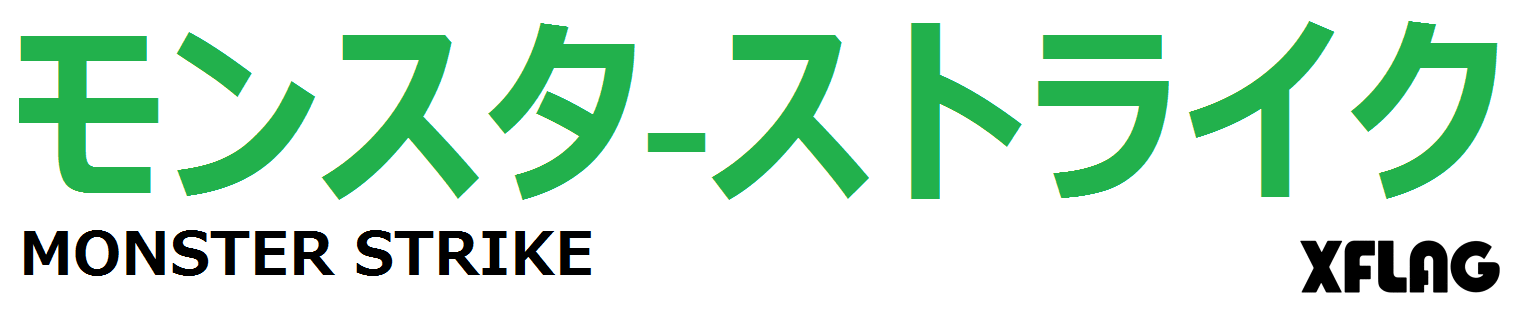
- Original net animation
- Directed by: Kazuya Ichikawa
- Produced by: Nao Hirasawa
- Written by: Yōichi Katō (Note: Series Composition (シリーズ構成)); Jirō Ishii (Note: Story (ストーリー))
- Music by: Hideki Sakamoto (#1–14); Satoru Kōsaki (#15–51); Keiichi Hirokawa (#15–51); Kuniyuki Takahashi (#17–51); Ryūichi Takada (#37–51)
- Studio: Studio Hibari (animation production); Ultra Super Pictures (production)
- Released: October 10, 2015 – December 3, 2016
- Runtime: 8 minutes
- Episodes: 51
Further information
Original net animation
Mermaid Rhapsody
Directed by	Toshiya Niidome (Note: The official Monster Strike YouTube channel credits Kazuya Ichikawa for direction in the episode's description, however, the ending credits give the Director (監督) credit to Toshiya Niidome (新留俊哉).)
Produced by	Nao Hirasawa
Written by	Jirō Ishii
Music by	Satoru Kōsaki; Keiichi Hirokawa; Kuniyuki Takahashi; Ryūichi Takada
Studio	Studio Hibari (animation production); Ultra Super Pictures (production)
Released	August 14, 2016
Runtime	51 minutes
Original net animation
Rain of Memories
Directed by	Hideki Tachibana
Produced by	Nao Hirasawa
Written by	Yōichi Katō; Jirō Ishii
Music by	Satoru Kōsaki; Keiichi Hirokawa; Kuniyuki Takahashi; Ryūichi Takada
Studio	Connect (animation production); Ultra Super Pictures (production)
Released	December 3, 2016
Runtime	47 minutes
Anime film
Monster Strike The Movie
Directed by	Shinpei Ezaki
Produced by	Nao Hirasawa
Written by	Yōichi Katō (Note: Story Composition (ストーリー構成)); Jirō Ishii
Music by	Monaca
Studio	Liden Films (animation production); Ultra Super Pictures (production)
Released	December 10, 2016
Runtime	101 minutes
Original net animation
An Encore and Continuance - Pandora's Box
Directed by	Kazuya Ichikawa
Produced by	Nao Hirasawa
Written by	Yōichi Katō; Jirō Ishii
Music by	Satoru Kōsaki; Keiichi Hirokawa; Kuniyuki Takahashi; Ryūichi Takada
Studio	Studio Hibari (animation production); Ultra Super Pictures (production)
Released	December 31, 2016
Runtime	9 minutes
Original net animation
The Long Awaited Utopia
Directed by	Takayuki Hamana
Produced by	Nao Hirasawa
Written by	Yōichi Katō; Jirō Ishii
Music by	MONACA
Studio	Yokohama Animation Laboratory
Released	March 25, 2017
Runtime	15 minutes
Original net animation
2nd Season
Directed by	Takayuki Hamana
Produced by	Nao Hirasawa
Written by	Yōichi Katō; Jirō Ishii
Music by	Monaca
Studio	Yokohama Animation Laboratory
Released	April 1, 2017 – September 2, 2017
Runtime	9–17 minutes
Episodes	23
Original net animation
A Rhapsody Called Lucy -The Very First Song-
Directed by	Kazuya Sakamoto
Produced by	Nao Hirasawa; Teppei Sunamura
Written by	Yōichi Katō
Music by	Keiichi Hirokawa; Kuniyuki Takahashi; Ryūichi Takada
Studio	Liden Films Kyoto Studio
Released	May 3, 2017
Runtime	21 minutes
Original net animation
MSonic! D'Artagnyan's Rise to Fame
Directed by	Keido Dei
Produced by	Nao Hirasawa; Teppei Sunamura
Written by	Yōichi Katō
Music by	Monaca
Studio	Liden Films
Released	June 14, 2017 – June 19, 2017
Runtime	10–20 minutes
Episodes	5
Original net animation
The Fading Cosmos
Directed by	Takayuki Hamana
Written by	Yōichi Katō; Jirō Ishii
Music by	Monaca
Studio	Yokohama Animation Laboratory
Released	October 7, 2017 – January 6, 2018
Runtime	8–24 minutes
Episodes	13
Original net animation
Sorcery in the Big City
Directed by	Daizen Komatsuda
Produced by	Shigeaki Miyata; Hiroaki Matsūra; Shirō Kanemori
Written by	Yōichi Katō
Music by	Ryō Sakai
Studio	Sanzigen
Released	December 1, 2017
Runtime	40 minutes
Episodes	1
Original net animation
Monster Strike the Animation: Trouble in Monster Strike
Directed by	Toshihiro Aramaki
Produced by	Takeshi Itō; Osamu Uchida; Mayumi Tachikawa; Akira Itō
Studio	Marza Animation Planet
Released	June 22, 2018
Runtime	4 minutes
Episodes	1
Original net animation
Monster Strike the Animation
Directed by	List: Yūki Nakamura (#1–12); Manabu Himukai (#13–17); Yudai Yamaguchi (#18–37, 51–59, 61, 63); Takanori Tsujimoto (#38–50, 58, 60, 62)
Produced by	List: Atsuko Ōgami (#1–12, 18–24); Yasuhiro Katō (#13–17, 25–44, 59); Yūichi Kameyama (#18–24, 58); Katsunori Ōuchi (#38–33); Tetsuya Kobayashi (#45–50); Yasuhira Miki (#58–60, 63); Keisuke Ishikawa (#58); Masaki Kikuchi (#58); Hirofumi Ishi (#58, 62); Yūsuke Ogura (#58); Federico Colpi (#58, 62); Lee Jieway (#58, 63); Takahiro Tsuzuki (#60); Tetsuo Yoshida (#60); Akihiko Yanamori (#62); Kayo Nakayama (#62); Ippei Tanaka (#63); Degin Lv (#63)
Written by	List: Masaya Honda (#1–24, 38–63); Yoshio Fukushima (#25–37); Yūta Okuyama (#38–44); Jun Tsugita (#58–63)
Music by	List: Masaru Yokoyama (#1–13, 18–24, 51–63); Hiroaki Tsutsumi (#14–17, 38–50); Nobuaki Nobusawa (#18–24); Moe Hyūga (#18–37)
Studio	List: ILCA (#1–12, 18–24); Anima (#1–12, 18–24); CGCG Studio (#13–17, 38–44, 58–59, 63); Dynamo Pictures (#25–37, 51–57, 61); Studio Gooney's (#45–50, 60, 62)
Released	July 8, 2018 – December 31, 2019
Runtime	10–16 minutes
Episodes	63
Anime film
Sora no Kanata
Directed by	Hiroshi Nishikiori
Produced by	Kiyotaka Waki
Written by	Takayo Ikami
Music by	Masaru Yokoyama
Studio	Orange
Released	October 5, 2018
Runtime	97 minutes
Anime film
Lucifer - Zetsubō no Yoake
Directed by	Kōbun Shizuno
Written by	Masaya Honda
Music by	Masaru Yokoyama
Studio	Anima; Dynamo Pictures
Released	November 6, 2020
Runtime	127 minutes
Anime television series
Monster Strike: Deadverse Reloaded
Directed by	Masao Ōkubo; Noriyuki Nakamura (assistant)
Written by	Hayato Kazano; Jin Haganeya
Music by	Masaru Yokoyama; Kana Hashiguchi; Natsuki Hamada
Studio	Yumeta Company
Licensed by	Amazon Prime Video: SEA: Medialink
Original network	Tokyo MX, AT-X, BS11
Original run	October 21, 2025 – December 23, 2025
Episodes	10
Anime television series
Mera×Death: The Unusual Love Between Me and the Grim Reaper
Directed by	Kenta Kushitani
Written by	Daisuke Ōhigashi
Music by	Masaru Yokoyama; Kana Hashiguchi; Natsuki Hamada
Studio	Qzil.la; Studio Keel
Original network	Tokyo MX
Original run	January 5, 2027 – scheduled

Monster Strike (Japanese: モンスターストライク, Hepburn: Monsutā Sutoraiku) is an anime series based on the role-playing physics game of the same name developed by Mixi for iOS and Android platforms. An anime film adaptation titled Monster Strike The Movie was released on December 10, 2016. A second anime film, titled Monster Strike The Movie: Sora no Kanata, was released on October 5, 2018, in Japan. A third film Monster Strike the Movie: Lucifer - Zetsubō no Yoake was slated to be released in June 2020, but was delayed to November 6, 2020, due to the COVID-19 pandemic.

The series' ending theme is a cover of Queen's "We Will Rock You" performed by Japanese vocalist Gloria. After a break, the ending theme switched to several songs by White Ash: "Strike", "Knock On Doors In You", "Mad T.Party (1865-2016)", and "Drop", all of which are from the band's August 17, 2016, EP Quest, including "Monster", a song composed for the MS Grand Prix 2016 Championship.

A second season of Monster Strike has been announced and premiered on April 1, 2017. The plot of the second season revolves around Ren, Aoi, Akira, Minami, and a new American transfer student named Mana dealing with problems caused by monsters manifesting in real life outside of the Monster Strike game. The season was split into two parts, with Monster Strike The Animation: The Fading Cosmos premiering on October 7, 2017.

The Monster Strike anime got its first spin-off on May 3, 2017, with the A Rhapsody Called Lucy -The Very First Song- OVA episode. This lead into the MSonic! D'Artagnyan's Rise to Fame special mini-series that premiered on June 14, 2017. Both A Rhapsody Called Lucy and MSonic! are set in a separate continuity from the main Monster Strike anime. An anime television series, titled Monster Strike: Deadverse Reloaded, was aired from October 21 to December 23, 2025, on Tokyo MX and all other stations nationwide as well as AT-X and BS11. A second anime television series, titled Mera×Death: The Unusual Love Between Me and the Grim Reaper, is set to premiere on January 5, 2027, on Tokyo MX and all other 10 stations nationwide.

== Plot ==
Ren Homura is a middle school student who moves back to his hometown with his mother and sister. He apparently cannot remember much of his previous life there. After having to get his cellphone repaired, he finds that the repairman installed Monster Strike onto it, and he later is attacked by a man who forces him into a real life game of Monster Strike, summoning a monster from within the game to attack Ren. Ren manages to summon a monster of his own, the diminutive dragon Oragon, and with help from his classmate Aoi Mizusawa, as well as an alter ego awoken by his own missing memories, Ren defeats the man's monster, seemingly freeing him from the control of an evil entity.

Ren is brought into the world of the town's Monster Strike Stadium leagues, where people play Monster Strike in what appears to be real life but are advanced holograms, as well as Aoi's desire to reunite her friends Akira Kagetsuki and Minami Wakaba into becoming a team of Monster Strike players. However, Akira will not play on a team because Ren is nothing like their former fourth member Haruma, and the air-headed Minami has become possessed by the same evil presence that forced other people to attack Ren and Aoi.

== Characters ==
=== Main characters ===
Ren Homura (焔 レン, Homura Ren)
Voiced by: Yūsuke Kobayashi
The protagonist. He cannot seem to remember anything about his life in his old town, but when his memories temporarily resurface he becomes an ace Monster Strike player. His signature monsters are Oragon, Fenrir X the Monsterwolf (炎邪狼フェンリルX, Enjarō Fenriru Ekkusu) and Ryoma the Visionary (維新の奇跡 坂本龍馬, Ishin no Kiseki Sakamoto Ryōma; voiced by Taishi Murata) who Transcends into Hero of the Restoration, Ryoma (維新回天の英傑 坂本龍馬, Ishin Kaiten no Eiketsu Sakamoto Ryōma).
Aoi Mizusawa (水澤 葵, Mizusawa Aoi)
Voiced by: Lynn
Ren's classmate. After helping Ren out in his first real world Monster Strike battle, she begins to plan him joining her old Monster Strike team, having already given him a special ring that allows him to properly control the apparently real monsters. Her signature monsters are Fox Metal the Legend (狐穴のフォックスメタル, Koketsu no Fokkusu Metaru; voiced by Itaru Yamamoto) and Napoleon the Valiant (英雄 ナポレオン, Eiyū Naporeon; voiced by Eri Suzuki).
Akira Kagetsuki (影月 明, Kagetsuki Akira)
Voiced by: Kengo Kawanishi
Another of Ren's classmates, and one of Aoi's now former teammates at playing Monster Strike competitively. He is a perfectionist who cannot see Ren as replacing their former fourth teammate Haruma. His signature monster is Kamui (神威), and he also has John Manjiro (ジョン万次郎, Jon Manjirō; voiced by Daiki Hamano).
Minami Wakaba (若葉 皆実, Wakaba Minami)
Voiced by: Juri Kimura
Another of Ren's classmates and one of Aoi's former Monster Strike teammates. She is very airheaded, and is an otaku who often mimics and references popular anime and manga. When she is introduced, she is under the control of the mysterious entity possessing people to lead to real life Monster Strike matches. Her signature monster is Dead Rabbits, Ltd. (デッドラビッツLtd., Deddo Rabittsu Rimiteddo; voiced by Chinami Hashimoto and Yuna Yoshino) and she also has Al-mi'raj (アルミラージ, Arumirāji).
Oragon (オラゴン)
Voiced by: Jun Fukushima/Atsushi Abe
A monster that Ren summons from his phone after Monster Strike is installed and he is facing off against a man possessed by the evil entity. Oragon claims to be the Prince of the Monster World who has come to the human world to become stronger, but most people believe he is simply a creation of the game.
Haruma Kagutsuchi (神倶土 春馬, Kagutsuchi Haruma)
Voiced by: Daisuke Ono
Haruma was previously the fourth member of Aoi, Minami, and Akira's Monster Strike team until he moved out of Kaminohara for reasons they cannot remember. After Ren defeats Doom, it is hinted that Haruma is somehow responsible for his lost memories, as well as the memories of the others. They track Haruma down in Shibuya, only to be easily defeated in Monster Strike, resulting in his demand that they become the top players in Kaminohara before speaking to him, again. After they succeed, he still refuses, and it is revealed that he is being controlled by Memento Mori, the Spirit of War (木の闘神 メメント・モリ, Ki no Tōshin Memento Mori; voiced by Sayaka Ohara), one of the War Gods posing as his allegedly dead mother, so they seek to free him from her control. His signature monster is Underworld Rebel Lucy (反逆の堕天使 ルシファー, Hangyaku no Datenshi Rushifā; voiced by Yōko Hikasa).
Mana Livingston (Mana rivingusutonu)
Voiced by: Hisako Kanemoto (Season 2)
A Transfer Student from America becomes friends with the Main Cast and learns about Monster Strike Game, even obtaining her own ring and Partner.

=== Supporting characters ===
Taiyou Shirahama (白浜 太陽, Shirahama Taiyō)
Voiced by: Katsuyuki Konishi
A student from another homeroom in Ren and Aoi's middle school who appears to inform them about Minami's odd behavior. He seems to be aware of the mysterious figures leading people to be possessed. His signature monster is Loki, God of Mischief (狡知の神 ロキ, Kōchi no Kami Roki; voiced by Junichi Yanagita). He is secretly the number 1 player in all of Kaminohara, and is possessed by the War God Nirvana, Inferno of War (炎の闘神ニルヴァーナ, Honō no Tōshin Niruvāna; voiced by Takehito Koyasu).
Jun Nikaido (二階堂 純, Nikaidō Jun)
Voiced by: Shizuka Ishigami
Kaminohara Middle School's student council president. She is the 4th ranked MS player in the area and challenges the recently-formed MS Club members to determine the fate of their club. Her monster is Cherry Spirit Sakura (花ノ国の精 桜, Hana-no-Kuni no Sei Sakura; voiced by Ikumi Hayama).
Sanjo Takii (滝井 参仗, Takii Sanjō)
Voiced by: Subaru Kimura
A jock at Kaminohara Middle School who is turned on by being put down by women. He is the 3rd ranked MS player in Kaminohara and attacks the group in the local history museum's Roman art wing, battling them with Dark Usurper Zeus (天邪神ダークゼウス, Tenjashin Dāku Zeusu; voiced by Rikiya Koyama).
Akane Noda (野田 茜, Noda Akane)
Voiced by: Rie Takahashi
A student at Kaminohara Middle School who is obsessed with Minami's family cafe. She even goes so far as to take a part time job at a rival chain store and provide bad service to get people to go to the Wakaba family store. She is the 2nd ranked MS player and uses Melodious Snow Bow (森の歌姫 白雪姫リボン, Mori no Utahime Shirayukihime Ribon; voiced by Yurika Kubo).
Mariko Kobayashi (小林 茉利子, Kobayashi Mariko)
Voiced by: Haruka Yamazaki
One of Haruma's new MS teammates. She is dressed in Harajuku fashion. She uses the monster Alice, Queen of Wonderland (不思議の国の女王アリス, Fushiginokuni no Joō Arisu; voiced by Haruka Watanabe).
Shino Ichinose (一ノ瀬 志乃, Ichinose Shino)
Voiced by: Saori Ōnishi
One of Haruma's new teammates. She claims to have psychic powers that allow her to accurately predict the outcomes of her MS matches and often gets nosebleeds. Her monster is Himiko, Ruler of Yamatai (邪馬台国女王 卑弥呼, Yamataikoku Joō Himiko; voiced by Kaori Nazuka) who slide Evolves into Himiko, Queen of Wa (倭国の女王 卑弥呼, Wakoku no Joō Himiko).
Kaoru Owada (大和田 薫, Ōwada Kaoru)
Voiced by: Hiroki Takahashi
Haruma's other MS teammate. He likes to show off his muscles, and believes a well-developed upper body is key to victory. His monster is Romeo Possessed (デモンズ・ロミオ, Demonzu Romio; voiced by Ryouta Takeuchi).

=== Other characters ===
Genma Kagutsuchi (神倶土 玄馬, Kagutsuchi Genma)
Voiced by: Kenjiro Tsuda
Genma, otherwise known as "K", is the first champion of Kaminohara's MS Colosseum. He lures Ren and his friends to the colosseum to battle Izanami the Inviter (黄泉津大神 イザナミ, Yomotsu Ōkami Izanami; voiced by Asami Seto), who transforms into the corrupted Izanami Zero (イザナミ零, Izanami Zero). Genma is also possessed by one of the War Gods, Doom, the Tide of War (水の闘神ドゥーム, Mizu no Tōshin Dūmu; voiced by Kenta Miyake).
Karin Homura (焔 花梨, Homura Karin)
Voiced by: Rie Murakawa
Ren's little sister.
Mitsuki Homura (焔 三月, Homura Mitsuki)
Voiced by: Mamiko Noto
Ren's mother.
Dolph Wakaba (ドルフ若葉, Dorufu Wakaba)
Voiced by: Yasuhiro Mamiya
Minami's father. He runs the family café with Minami after. He dresses like a soldier but his personality far from tough and imposing as his appearance would suggest.
Lyra Kiskill (キスキル・リラ, Kisukiru Rira)
Voiced by: Kana Hanazawa
A mysterious young woman Ren and his friends encounter on their trip to Okinawa. She is actually a monster who has been captured by the American military during their tests on weaponizing Monster Strike.
Lieutenant Amanda Jensen (アマンダ・ジェンセン中尉, Amanda Jensen Chūi)
Voiced by: Yuki Kaida
A lieutenant in the U.S. Navy. She is Dolph's friend's daughter who shows Ren, Aoi, Minami, and Akira around Okinawa. She is secretly trying to free Lyra Kiskill from her superiors in the Navy.
Colonel James Styles (ジェイムズ・スタイルズ大佐, Jeimuzu Sutairuzu Taisa)
Voiced by: Shō Hayami
An American military officer working with the company NADTDcom to find a way to control Monster Strike monsters for the American military's gain. He uses a powerful monster named Oceanus.

== Episodes ==
=== Season 1 (2015-16) ===
No. overall	No. in season	Title	Original release date
1	1	"The First Strike!" "Kore ga Hajime no Sutoraiku!" (これが始めのストライク！)	October 10, 2015
Ren returns to the town of his childhood, Kaminohara. Strangely, Ren is unable to recall any memories of the town. Meanwhile, his smartphone installs a mysterious game called Monster Strike — heralding the start of a desperate battle!
2	2	"Slingshot Away! Call Me Oragon!" "Yubi de Hippare! Oragon!" (指でヒッパレ！オラゴン！)	October 10, 2015
Ren is forced into a heated battle with the bestial Fenrir X. Unable to control his companion Oragon and on the verge of defeat, a girl appears before Ren. Who could she be?
3	3	"Aoi Mizusawa's Secret" "Mizusawa Aoi" (水澤葵)	October 17, 2015
Almost every junior high student in Kaminohara plays Monster Strike. After a brief meeting, Aoi invites Ren to a special place—one where MS players gather.
4	4	"A Night at the Colloseum" "Mayonaka no Monsuto Koroshiamu" (真夜中のモンストコロシアム)	October 24, 2015
5	5	"Mall Brawl" "Shoppingu Mōru no Kettō!" (ショッピングモールの決闘！)	October 31, 2015
6	6	"The Glinting Blade" "Senkō no Katana" (閃光の刃)	November 7, 2015
7	7	"Operation Recruit Akira" "Kagetsuki Akira Kan'yū Keikaku!" (影月明 勧誘計画！)	November 14, 2015
8	8	"Evil Eye Minami" "Jagan demo Wakaba Minami da zo!" (邪眼でも若葉皆実だぞ！)	November 21, 2015
9	9	"SOS! A Shocking Video?!" "Aoi no Hazukashisugiru Dōga!" (葵の恥ずかしすぎる動画！)	November 28, 2015
10	10	"Shopfront Shocker" "Shōten-gai Sensen Ijō Ari" (商店街戦線異状あり)	December 5, 2015
11	11	"Welcome, Minami!" "Minami, Nakama Haittatte yo" (皆実、仲間入ったってよ)	December 12, 2015
12	12	"Ora-gone?!" "Oragon Kiki Ippatsu!" (オラゴン危機一発！)	December 19, 2015
13	13	"Impossible Task" "Chōzetsu Kōrin" (超絶降臨)	December 26, 2015
14	14	"Izanami" "Izanami Shisu" (イザナミ死す)	January 2, 2016
15	15	"Beware the Warrior God" "Tōshin Kōrin" (闘神降臨)	March 26, 2016
16	16	"Counter! A Strike Shot for the Ages!" "Hankō no Sutoraiku Shotto" (反攻のストライクショット)	March 26, 2016
17	17	"Pieces of Memories" "Kioku no Himitsu" (記憶の秘密)	April 2, 2016
18	18	"Where Art Thou, Haruma?" "Haruma o Sagase" (春馬を探せ)	April 9, 2016
19	19	"Lucy the Annihilator" "Senmetsu no Rushifā" (殲滅のルシファー)	April 16, 2016
20	20	"From the Ring, Hope" "Hikaru Sutoraiku Ringu" (光るストライクリング)	April 23, 2016
21	21	"Come One and All: MS Club" "Kitare! Monsutobu" (きたれ！モンスト部)	April 30, 2016
22	22	"The Saber Amid the Blossoms" "Hiken! Sakurafubuki" (秘剣！桜吹雪)	May 7, 2016
23	23	"Dark Usurper Zeus" "Tenjashin Dāku Zeusu" (天邪神ダークゼウス)	May 14, 2016
24	24	"Melodious Snow Bow" "Mori no Utahime Ribon" (森の歌姫リボン)	May 21, 2016
25	25	"Nirvana, Inferno of War" "Honō no Tōshin Niruvāna" (炎の闘神ニルヴァーナ)	May 28, 2016
26	26	"Assemble, Assault, and Assail" "Asu ni Mukatte Ute!" (アスに向かって撃て！)	June 4, 2016
27	27	"An Accidental Double Date" "Gesu na Daburu Dēto" (ゲスなダブルデート)	June 11, 2016
28	28	"Booya! Return to Shibuya" "Futatabi Shibuya e" (再び渋谷へ)	June 18, 2016
29	29	"Alice in a Mad Wonderland" "Arisu In Maddorando" (アリス・イン・マッドランド)	June 25, 2016
30	30	"The Scarlet Shrine Maiden" "Shintaku no Miko" (神託の巫女)	July 2, 2016
31	31	"Blade Versus Gun" "Kami no Yaiba to Akuma no Jūkō" (神の刃と悪魔の銃口)	July 9, 2016
32	32	"The Flock of Bahamut" "Sen no Bahamūto" (千のバハムート)	July 16, 2016
33	33	"The Indomitable Dragon" "Fumetsu no Doragonsupiritto" (不滅のドラゴンスピリット)	July 23, 2016
34	34	"Ryoma vs. Lucy" "Ryōma vs Rushifā" (龍馬vsルシファー)	August 6, 2016
35	35	"Death's Embrace" "Shi o Omoe" (死を想え)	August 13, 2016
35.5	35.5	"Mermaid Rhapsody" "Māmeido Rapusodi" (マーメイド・ラプソディ)	August 14, 2016
special episode: Minami's father, a former mercenary, is invited to an American naval party. Ren and the gang end up heading to Okinawa with him for summer break. On a sandy beach, Ren meets a mysterious girl."Help me..." The girl leaves Ren with those words as she disappears.Ren is drawn to the girl and the meaning of those words. He makes it his mission to save her, and uncover the truth. Who is the girl? Why did she ask Ren for help? The girl's true identity slowly unveils...
36	36	"The Imprisoned Lily" "Higanbana no Rōgoku" (彼岸花の牢獄)	August 20, 2016
37	37	"In Darkness, Ryoma" "Kuro no Sakamoto Ryōma" (黒の坂本龍馬)	August 27, 2016
38	38	"The Truth of K" "Kei no Shinjitsu" (Kの真実)	September 3, 2016
39	39	"Akira and Haruma" "Akira to Haruma" (明と春馬)	September 10, 2016
40	40	"Gather in Kaminohara! - You need help? I'm there! -" "Kessei! Ribon shin'eitai?" (結成！リボン親衛隊？)	September 17, 2016
41	41	"Off the Charts Performance" "XFLAG PARK"	September 24, 2016
42	42	"The Sun Sets On Orochi" "Yakumotatsu Ōma no Yoru" (八雲立つ 逢魔の夜)	October 1, 2016
43	43	"An Offering To Orochi- Dance Until You Break!" "Yakumo no Ouma no Yoru" (八岐ノ森の贄比女)	October 8, 2016
44	44	"An End to the Past" "Furuki Sekai no Owari" (古き世界の終わり)	October 15, 2016
45	45	"World Ender Babel" "Fūin no Hakaishin Baberu" (封印の破壊神バベル)	October 22, 2016
46	46	"The Descent of Angels" "Hakui no Tenshi, Kōrin" (白衣の天使、降臨)	October 29, 2016
47	47	"Ziggurat of Chaos" "Konton no Jigurāto" (混沌のジグラート)	November 5, 2016
48	48	"Oraternative Memories" "Orutanatibu Doragon no Kioku" (オルタナティブドラゴンの記憶)	November 13, 2016
A petrifying attack hits Oragon as he makes a stand. Oragon, on his last dregs of strength, begins to glow. A light flashes, parting to reveal the depths of Oragon's memories...
49	49	"Karma, Light of War" "Hikari no Tōshin Karuma" (光の闘神カルマ)	November 19, 2016
Karma, the Light of War appears. Ren and friends battle to reclaim their memories, but there is something about Karma's arms...
50	50	"Of Light and Flame" "Kami no Hikari, Shin no Honō" (神の光、神の炎)	November 26, 2016
The party is increasingly weakened by Karma's debuffs, but Akira realizes a path to victory and dashes forward with Kamui.
51	51	"Strike Shot! An End and New Beginnings" "Owari to Hajimari no Sutoraiku Shotto" (終わりと始まりのストライクショット)	December 3, 2016
52	52	"Strike Shot! An End and New Beginnings" "Owari to Hajimari no Sutoraiku Shotto" (終わりと始まりのストライクショット)	December 3, 2016
Ren is thrown into despair as he is confronted with an amnesiac Aoi, Minami, and Akira, but then a familiar voice comes from his smartphone.

=== Monster Strike 2 (2017) ===
No. overall	No. in season	Title	Original release date
51.5	0	"The Long-Awaited Utopia"; Transliteration: "Zen'Yasai Supesharu `Katsubō no Hate no Risōkyō" (Japanese: 渇望の果ての理想郷」転校生は超絶級？)	March 26, 2017
A recap of the first season.
52	1	"The Transfer Student Is Impossible-Level"; Transliteration: "Tenkōsei wa chōzetsu-kyū?" (Japanese: 転校生は超絶級？)	April 1, 2017
There are still monsters about, and the gang is spending their days fighting them. They go to school during the day, and when they are not at school, they protect the city from monsters. But their peaceful routine is interrupted by the arrival of Mana Livingstone: a transfer student from America who's got the craziest ideas about Japan!
53	2	"The Karmic Fist Of Wrath"; Transliteration: "Edo ni todoroku fundo no gō ken" (Japanese: 穢土に轟く忿怒の業拳)	April 8, 2017
Ren agrees to take Mana around to see the town, but she is anxious about and uncomfortable around Monster Strike. When Ren gives her a MS ring, however, she gladly accepts it, thinking it is an engagement ring. When she realizes her mistake, she runs off in shame... and that is when a monster makes it move.
54	3	"Walpurgis Night"; Transliteration: "Warupurugisunoyoru" (Japanese: ワルプルギスの夜)	April 15, 2017
Mana and Walpurgis save the day at the last minute by defeating Fudou Myouou. Mana is now a full-fledged member of the team. But who is Walpurgis, and what does she want?
55	4	"Chicken Skewers, Manliness and the Voyager"; Transliteration: "Yakitori・Otokogi・Bōken-ō" (Japanese: 焼き鳥・男気・冒険王)	April 22, 2017
Maya has another crazy idea in her head: she wants to see Ren's "manliness". Ren takes her to a place that sells chicken skewers, where he meet the very manly Sinbad. But their manly meal is interrupted when Azazel comes to collect on Sinbad's debts, and he does not care how what happens to the people around him!
56	5	"Seventh Galaxy Explosion"; Transliteration: "Sakuretsu! Sebunsu・Guarakushī" (Japanese: 炸裂！セブンス・ギャラクシー)	April 29, 2017
57	6	"Holy Healing Hot Springs"; Transliteration: "Onsen, Sore wa Seinaru Iyashi" (Japanese: 温泉、それは聖なる癒し)	May 6, 2017
58	7	"The Beautiful Angel's Steamy Case File"; Transliteration: "Bijin Tenshi no Yukemuri Jiken-bo" (Japanese: 美人天使の湯けむり事件簿)	May 13, 2017
59	8	"CEO Madarame"; Transliteration: "Madarame CEO" (Japanese: 斑目CEO)	May 20, 2017
60	9	"A World with No Fighting"; Transliteration: "Arasiu no Nai Sekai" (Japanese: 争いの無い世界)	May 27, 2017
61	10	"The Singularity of All Creation"; Transliteration: "Shinrabanshō no Tokui-ten" (Japanese: 森羅万象の特異点)	June 3, 2017
62	11	"Even the Fortune Teller Is Baffled! Where's the Energy Point?"; Transliteration: "Uranaishi mo Konwaku! Enajīpointo wa Doko ni?" (Japanese: 占い師も困惑！エナジーポイントは何処に？)	June 10, 2017
63	12	"The King of Terror"; Transliteration: "Kyōfu no Daiō" (Japanese: 恐怖の大王)	June 17, 2017
65	13	"The Great Seer Nostradamus"; Transliteration: "Dai Yogen-sha Nosutoradamusu" (Japanese: 大予言者ノストラダムス)	June 24, 2017
66	14	"The Eternal Endless Cycle"; Transliteration: "Rin'ne e Michibiku Bodaiju no Sen Kai" (Japanese: 輪廻へ導く菩提樹の仙峡)	July 1, 2017
67	15	"Each of Their Feelings"; Transliteration: "Sorezore no Omoi" (Japanese: それぞれの想い)	July 8, 2017
68	16	"Robin Hood (Evolution)"; Transliteration: "Mori no Eiyū Robin・Fuddo" (Japanese: 森の英雄 ロビン・フッド)	July 15, 2017
69	17	"The Moon's Eternal Dreamer"; Transliteration: "Towa o Yume mu Megami" (Japanese: 永久を夢む女神)	July 22, 2017
70	18	"Tsukuyomi VS Tsukuyomi: Zero"; Transliteration: "Tsukuyomi vs Tsukuyomi Rei" (Japanese: ツクヨミVSツクヨミ零)	July 29, 2017
71	19	"The Lady Pirate Alwida's Arduous Battle"; Transliteration: "Onna Kaizoku Arubida no Funtō" (Japanese: 女海賊アルビダの奮闘)	August 5, 2017
72	20	"Admiral Navis the God Killer"; Transliteration: "Kami-goroshi no Teitoku Neivuisu" (Japanese: 神殺しの提督ネイヴィス)	August 12, 2017
73	21	"The Scheming of Blackbeard Teach"; Transliteration: "Kurohige Tīchi no Takurami" (Japanese: 黒髭ティーチの企み)	August 19, 2017
74	22	"The Truth of Mazu"; Transliteration: "Maso no Shinjitsu" (Japanese: 媽祖の真実)	August 26, 2017
75	23	"The Last Guardian"; Transliteration: "Saigo no ban'nin" (Japanese: 最後の番)	September 2, 2017

=== Monster Strike 3 (2018-19) ===
No. overall	No. in season	Title	Original release date
76	24	"Beginning of the End"; Transliteration: "Owarinohajimari" (Japanese: 終わりの始まり)	October 7, 2017
77	25	"Power Unmatched: Miroku Rises"; Transliteration: "Attōtekina chikara no sa! Tachifusagaru miroku" (Japanese: 圧倒的な力の差！立ちふさがるミロク)	October 14, 2017
78	26	"Mana's Hidden Truth"; Transliteration: "Akasa reru Mana no shinjitsu" (Japanese: 明かされるマナの真実)	October 21, 2017
79	27	"Saving Mana"; Transliteration: "Mana no Setsuyaku" (Japanese: マナの節約)	October 28, 2017
80	28	"Yomi, Assassin of the Underworld"; Transliteration: "Mana o sukue! Sorezore no ketsui" (Japanese: マナを救え！それぞれの決意)	November 4, 2017
81	29	"Lucy vs. Yomi"; Transliteration: "Rushifā VS Yomi" (Japanese: ルシファーVS黄泉)	November 11, 2017
82	30	"Target: Mana Anima"; Transliteration: "Teki wa Mana Anima" (Japanese: 敵はマナ・アニマ)	November 18, 2017
83	31	"What I must do, only I know." Transliteration: "Waga Nasu Koto wa ga Nomi zo Shiru" (Japanese: 我が成すことは我のみぞ知る)	November 25, 2017
84	32	"Ryoma VS Miroku"; Transliteration: "Shitō Ryūma to Miroku" (Japanese: 死闘 龍馬とミロク)	December 6, 2017
85	33	"Ryoma, Heart Ablaze"; Transliteration: "Ryūma, Inochi o Moyashite" (Japanese: 龍馬、命を燃やして)	December 13, 2017
86	34	"Mana, Angel of Love"; Transliteration: "Jōai no Tenshi Mana" (Japanese: 情愛の天使 マナ)	December 20, 2017
87	35	"Vanishing into the Cosmos"; Transliteration: "Uchū ni Kie Yuku" (Japanese: 宇宙に消えゆく)	December 27, 2017
88	36	"What Was Left Behind"; Transliteration: "Nokosa Reta Mono" (Japanese: 残されたもの)	January 6, 2018

== Films ==
There have been two anime films based on the Monster Strike anime series.

=== Monster Strike The Movie ===
An anime film adaptation titled Monster Strike The Movie was released on December 10, 2016.

=== Monster Strike The Movie: Sora no Kanata ===
A second anime film adaptation titled Monster Strike The Movie: Sora no Kanata was released on October 5, 2018. Studio Orange animated the film.

=== Monster Strike the Movie: Lucifer - Zetsubō no Yoake ===
A third anime film adaptation title Monster Strike the Movie: Lucifer - Zetsubō no Yoake was slated to be released in June 2020, but was pushed to November 6, 2020, due to the COVID-19 pandemic.

== Reception ==
On YouTube, the anime series had been watched 100 million times by August 2016, and over 200 million times as of June 2017.

Monster Strike The Movie grossed ¥740 million ($6.8 million) at the Japanese box office. The second film, Sora no Kanata, has grossed ¥364,672,100 yen ($3.26 million) in Japan as of October 16, 2018. Both films have grossed a combined ¥1,104,672,100 ($10.06 million) at the Japanese box office as of October 16, 2018.
