= Monster Strike The Movie =

2016 Japanese animated action adventure film by Shinpei Ezaki

- Theatrical release poster
- Kanji: モンスターストライク THE MOVIE はじまりの場所へ
- Directed by: Shinpei Ezaki
- Screenplay by: Taku Kishimoto
- Story by: Yōichi Katō (Note: Story Composition (ストーリー構成)); Jirō Ishii
- Based on: Monster Strike by Mixi and Yoshiki Okamoto
- Produced by: Nao Hirasawa
- Cinematography: Tatsuya Nomura
- Edited by: Mai Hasegawa
- Music by: Monaca
- Production companies: Liden Films; Ultra Super Pictures; XFlag Pictures
- Distributed by: Warner Bros. Pictures Japan
- Release date: 10 December 2016 (Japan)
- Running time: 103 minutes
- Country: Japan
- Language: Japanese
- Box office: ¥740 million ($6.8 million)

Monster Strike The Movie (Japanese: モンスターストライク THE MOVIE はじまりの場所へ) is a 2016 Japanese animated action-adventure film directed by Shinpei Ezaki, written by Taku Kishimoto and based on the video game Monster Strike by Mixi and Yoshiki Okamoto. It is a prequel and sequel to the ONA anime series of the same name. It was released in Japan by Warner Bros. on 10 December 2016. The film was eventually released on DVD and Blu-ray in Japan on April 19, 2017, as well as a limited edition.

== Plot ==
It is a prequel story to the main events of the first season.

== Cast ==
- Maaya Sakamoto as Ren Homura (young)
- Tomo Muranaka as Haruma Kagutsuchi (young)
- Lynn as Aoi Mizusawa
- Juri Kimura as Minami Wakaba
- Kengo Kawanishi as Akira Kagetsuki
- Jun Fukushima as Oragon
- Yūsuke Kobayashi as Ren Homura
- Nana Mizuki as Arthur
- Kōichi Yamadera as Genome
- Kin'ya Kitaōji as Kentarō Ishibashi

== Box office ==
On its opening weekend in Japan, the film was number-one by admissions, with 390,416, and number-two by gross, with ¥439.6 million ($3.8 million). Its final box office gross in Japan was ¥740 million ($6.8 million).
