= Monster Strike =

- Developer: Mixi
- Publisher: Mixi
- Designer: Yoshiki Okamoto
- Platforms: Android, iOS
- Release: iOS: JP: August 8, 2013; NA: October 20, 2014; Android: JP: December 14, 2013; NA: October 21, 2014
- Genres: Role-playing, physics
- Mode: Single-player

Monster Strike (モンスターストライク, Monsutā Sutoraiku) is a mobile Japanese role-playing physics game with elements of puzzle, strategy and cooperative multiplayer. It is developed by Mixi for iOS and Android platforms. The game was created by former Capcom game designer Yoshiki Okamoto. In Japan, its name is often shortened to MonSt (モンスト, Monsuto). The game can be summed up as a cross between Nintendo's Pokémon and Capcom's Metal Walker; the former in that it centers around monster collecting and the latter in that battles take place using catapult mechanics.

By October 2018, the game grossed over $7.2 billion worldwide, surpassing Puzzle & Dragons to become the highest-grossing mobile app of all time. The game has grossed a total revenue at least $10 billion, and has since become one of the highest-grossing media franchises of all time.

A more traditional role-playing game of Monster Strike was released for the Nintendo 3DS in December 2015. The game was adapted into an anime series in 2015. An anime film adaptation titled Monster Strike The Movie was released on December 10, 2016. A second anime film, titled Monster Strike the Movie: Sora no Kanata, was released on October 5, 2018, in Japan. A third anime film titled Monster Strike The Movie: Lucifer Zetsubō no Yoake was slated to be released in June 2020 but it has since been delayed due to the COVID-19 pandemic.

== Gameplay ==
A game of Monster Strike where the player prepares to launch one of their monsters at enemies on the field

Monster Strike has been compared to competitor Puzzle & Dragons and other freemium puzzle games in that the player battles waves of monsters to collect them, fuse them, and evolve them and earn gold and other items through gameplay to get stronger monsters, and build a list of friends with monsters to use as well. What sets it apart is that rather than being a tile-matching video game, the player aims and flicks their monsters around on a field, similar to billiards/pool, bumping off of walls and enemies to perform damage. Colliding the currently in play monster with any of the allied monsters activates Bump Combos (友情コンボ, Yūjō Konbo; "Friend Combos") that set off explosions, energy beams, or projectiles to perform damage on opponent monsters. Every turn, numerous counters on enemy monsters count down to launch various attacks that deal damage or add hazards to the field. Player monsters often have other unique passive abilities to counter these hazards, or may have passive abilities that cause greater damage to particular kinds of enemy monsters. Some monsters also have gauges that when it is launched at the right time, it activates a secondary gauge ability as well as slightly increases their attack strength. Each of the player's monsters also has its own counter, which allows the player to activate the monster's Strike Shot (ストライクショット, Sutoraiku Shotto) attack to perform more damage. The final battle of each Quest Mission features a Boss monster that has a moving critical hit point. Monster Strike also offers co-operative play for up to 4 players.

Quests in the game are divided into Solo and Co-Op and then Normal and Event. Event Quests are only available for limited periods of time and often feature rare monsters that are powerful or that can be used in the Ascension of other monsters. Completing the levels of a quest awards the player monsters, catalysts, and coins. In Normal Quests, for completing the penultimate level in the quest, players are awarded a rare catalyst and for completing the final level, they are awarded an Orb as well as unlocking a Bonus Level featuring the experience-increasing or high-selling turtle monsters. A Mission Log is also given to players to reach certain goals in Quests to win other Catalysts, Orbs, or experience-increasing monsters. A third set of Quests are available in the Temple of Heroes. Clearing any of these awards the player Ableberries (わくわくの実, Wakuwaku no Mi; "Exciting Fruit") that gives one of the player's monsters an additional stat bonus. Initially, only certain Hatcher monsters could have an Ableberry. Later, the ability for rare Event Quest monsters to have Ableberries was added, but only if the player has Max Luck on two copies of the same monster. A Tower of Champions event is also occasionally run in Japan, providing an increased challenge for players to win rare monsters and prizes. A similar event was held in the North American version of the game for Christmas 2015.

Each monster has its own HP, Attack, and Speed statistics. The player's three monsters' HP and their friend or helper's monsters' HP are combined for a total HP. Attack determines how much damage the player's monster does to enemy monsters and Speed determines how fast (how much distance) the monster travels in a single turn. These values are increased by fusing monsters together to gain experience, or using special stat-only increasing monsters. There is also a Luck (ラック, Rakku) value, symbolized by a four-leaf clover, that determines the possibility of obtaining bonus prizes at the end of a Mission. Luck can only be increased by fusing two of the same monsters together, or monsters in the same evolutionary line; fusing two Red Smydras or a Red Drake and a Red Smydra will both cause Luck to increase. An additional Luck Skill was added to the game, allowing certain monsters to either have a critical hit or a shield to prevent damage on one turn.

After raising a monster to its maximum level, the player can Evolve (進化, Shinka) them through the use of Evolution Catalysts (進化アイテム, Shinka Aitemu; "Evolution Items"). Players can also Ascend (神化, Kamika) their monsters into even more powerful forms through the use of other monsters with specific Luck levels. Divination (獣神化, Jūshinka) is a combination of the two evolutions, giving the monster a second tier to their Strike Shot and a second slot for an Ableberry.

The game also features Hatchers (ガチャ, Gacha) that the player spends either Friend Points (earned through choosing another player's monster to complete a level) for fairly common monsters or Orbs for rarer monsters. The main Hatcher cycles through a series of different sets of monsters that have an increased availability, with the rarest found during the Legend Series (獣神祭, Jūshinsai) events. The Friend Hatcher is sometimes used for giving out rare Event monsters for collaborations, such as with Line Corporation and Weekly Shōnen Jump in Japan. The Japanese edition of the game has also featured a special Hatcher to commemorate the release of Godzilla requiring special Godzilla Sharls to use it. Collaborations have also been made with Lawson's convenience store chain, Monster Hunter Big Game Hunting Quest, Bakusō Kyōdai Let's & Go!!, Game Walker, Parasyte, Teenage Mutant Ninja Turtles, Rebuild of Evangelion, Love Live! Sunshine!! and Ultraman.

The game has an in-game store to purchase Orbs that are used to continue lost Missions, expand the number of the player's available saved monsters, restore Stamina used to play Missions, or use them in the game's Hatcher to earn powerful and rare monsters.

== Development ==
The game was created by former Capcom game designer Yoshiki Okamoto. Monster Strike was originally released in Japan in September 2013, and by November 2013 it was credited with saving Mixi, originally a social media network, under the XFLAG brand, after the app became popular in the iOS App Store. In September 2014, it was announced that a North American version and a South Korean version would be released. South Korean support ended on November 30, 2016, while North American support ended on August 1, 2017.

== Music ==
A theme song for Monster Strike titled "Hippare! Monster Strike" (ヒッパレ！モンスターストライク, Hippare! Monsutā Sutoraiku; "Pull! Monster Strike") was written by Nagae Kuwabara (lyrics) and Riichiro Kuwabara (composition) and performed by Hironobu Kageyama. Kageyama performed it live for the first time at the Monster Strike first anniversary event at the Nico Nico Douga live house nicofarre on October 25, 2014, and the song was later released for sale on October 29.

== Reception ==
=== Critical reception ===
Reception

Aggregate score
Aggregator	Score
GameRankings	75%

Review scores
Publication	Score
Pocket Gamer	6/10
TouchArcade	4/5
Android Authority	7.5/10

With the English language version's release, a reviewer for Android Authority said that the game was fun, but similar to other games on the market, and had concerns about the length of the game's tutorial levels. On Pocket Gamer, the reviewer found the game not challenging, as there did not seem to be any strategy, and as it is easy to earn Orbs (the premium currency), he could easily use the Hatcher to get better monsters, resulting in just a wait for the Stamina to refill and fuse monsters, until you run out of gold to fuse and space in the Monster Box.

=== Commercial performance ===
During July–September 2014, the game grossed ¥19.4 billion ($161 million) in content revenue, about 90% of Mixi's total income for the quarter. The game's revenue increased to ¥30 billion ($283 million) in the next quarter, October–December 2014. It overtook Puzzle & Dragons as Japan's highest-grossing mobile app in late 2014, and its revenues exceeded ¥40 billion ($333.8 million) per quarter during January–March 2015. By March 2015, Monster Strike had been downloaded more than 30 million times and had daily revenues of $3.8 million. During April–June 2015, the game's revenue increased to ¥47 billion ($378 million) per quarter. By June 30, 2015, daily revenues reached $4.2 million. During April–December 2015, the game grossed approximately ¥135 billion ($1.224 billion), roughly 90% of Mixi's sales during the period.

It was the highest-grossing mobile game of 2016, earning a revenue of $1.3 billion for the year, more than Pokémon Go and Clash Royale. Monster Strike earned another $1.3 billion in 2017, when it was the year's third highest-grossing mobile game, behind Arena of Valor and Fantasy Westward Journey. In Japan, the game grossed ¥104.1 billion ($658 million) between January 2017 and October 3, 2017. By May 2018, the game had over 45 million players worldwide.

The game's popularity has led to a partnership with Sumitomo Mitsui Banking Corporation to issue VISA credit cards in Japan in 2015.

By October 2018, the game grossed over $7.2 billion worldwide, surpassing Puzzle & Dragons to become the highest-grossing mobile app of all time. The game grossed a further ¥101.6 billion ($642 million) in Japan during 2019, bringing the game's total revenue to at least $8.13 billion as of 2019. It was the world's second top-grossing mobile game during the 2020 New Year period, behind only fellow JRPG title Fate/Grand Order.

== Nintendo 3DS game ==
Monster Strike
- Developer: XFLAG
- Publisher: XFLAG
- Platform: Nintendo 3DS
- Release: JP: December 17, 2015
- Genres: Puzzle, role-playing, physics, strategy
- Modes: Single-player, multiplayer

A RPG version of Monster Strike for the Nintendo 3DS was released in Japan on December 17, 2015. It features characters and stories introduced in the anime. Characters based on Japanese YouTubers Tomotake "Max" Murai, former CEO of Japanese iPhone news and reviews site AppBank, and beatboxer Hikakin, who both do Let's Play videos of Monster Strike, are featured in the game as NPCs.

Before the launch day, XFLAG announced that they had shipped over one million copies of the game, making it the highest selling Japan-only 3DS release of all time. The game debuted in Japan at the No.1 spot in the weekly sales chart based on figures by Media Create, selling a total of 437,903 copies, and dethroning Monster Hunter Generations after a three-week streak in the top spot.

== Anime ==
A web anime adaptation of Monster Strike premiered on October 10, 2015, on YouTube. The series' ending theme is a cover of Queen's "We Will Rock You" performed by Japanese vocalist Gloria.

A second season of Monster Strike has been announced and premiered on April 1, 2017. On YouTube, the anime series had been watched 100 million times by August 2016, and over 200 million times as of June 2017.

The Monster Strike anime got its first spin-off on May 3, 2017, with the A Rhapsody Called Lucy -The Very First Song- OVA episode. This leads into the MSonic! D'Artagnyan's Rise to Fame special mini-series that premiered on June 14, 2017. Both A Rhapsody Called Lucy and MSonic! are set in a separate continuity from the main Monster Strike anime.

== Localization ==
Mixi released an English version of Monster Strike for North American and Australian markets in 2014. It was marketed on online websites such as on Facebook. However, Mixi ceased marketing in August 2016, with English eventually being shut down in August 2017 due to both competition in those markets.

== See also ==
- Puzzle & Dragons
- Puzzle & Dragons X
- Monster Strike (anime)
- Monster Strike The Movie
