= Liden Films =

Japanese animation studio

Liden Films, Inc.
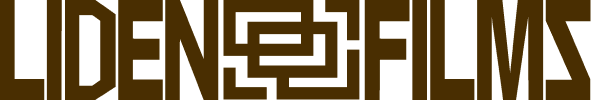

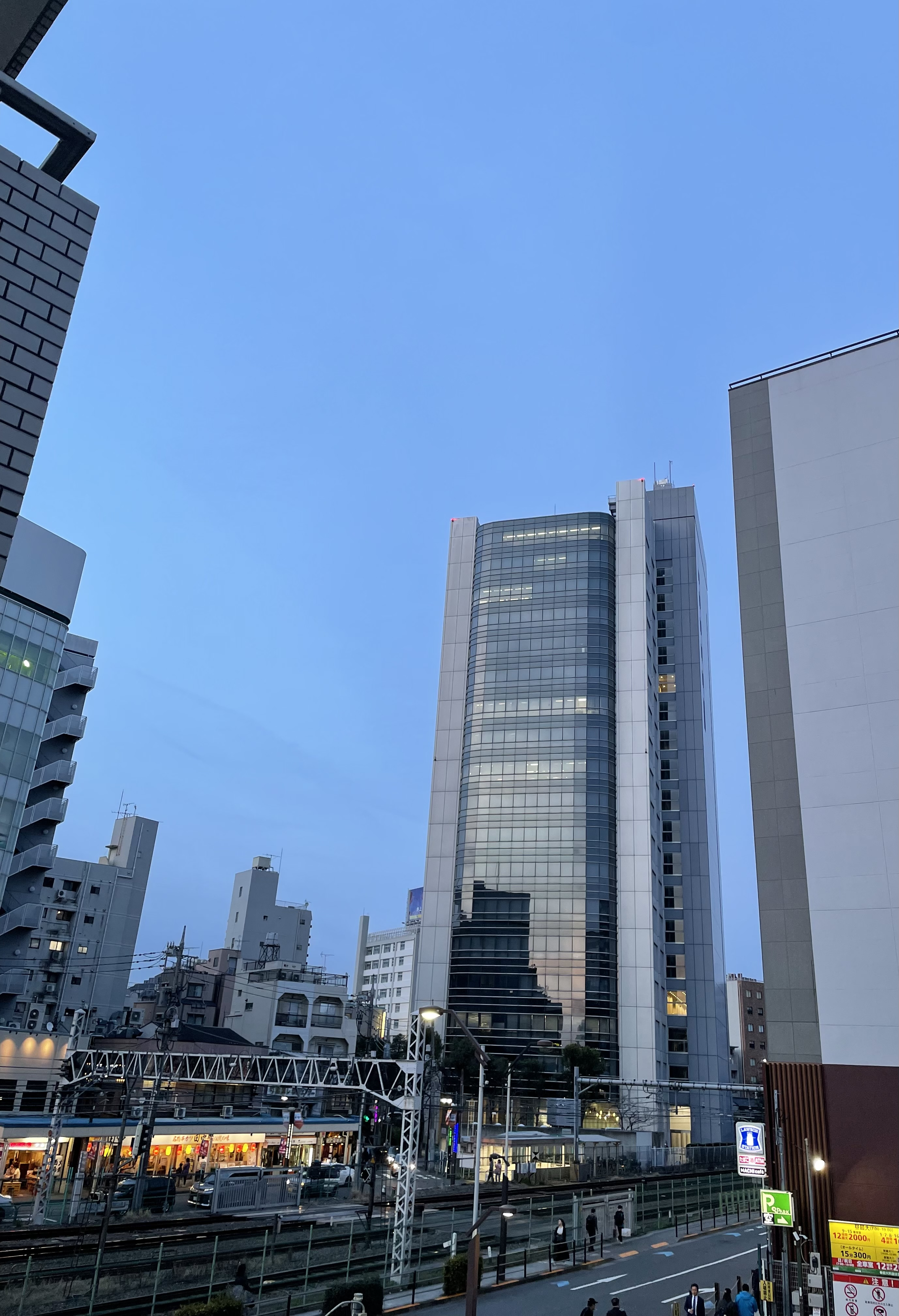
- Daiwa Ogikubo Tower, where Liden Films' head office is located
- Native name: 株式会社ライデンフィルム
- Romanized name: Kabushiki-gaisha Raiden Firumu
- Type: Kabushiki gaisha
- Industry: Anime
- Founded: February 22, 2012; 14 years ago
- Headquarters: Ogikubo, Suginami, Tokyo, Japan
- Key people: Tetsurou Satomi (CEO); Yuuichi Tashiro (director)
- Number of employees: 303 (as of April 2026)
- Parent: Ultra Super Pictures
- Divisions: LIDENFILMS Tokyo Studio; LIDENFILMS Tokyo 2nd Studio; LIDENFILMS Kyoto Studio; LIDENFILMS Osaka Studio; LIDENFILMS Fukuya Studio
- Website: lidenfilms.jp

Liden Films, Inc. (株式会社ライデンフィルム, Kabushiki-gaisha Raiden Firumu; stylized as LIDENFILMS) is a Japanese animation studio and production enterprise headquartered in Kamiogi, Suginami, Tokyo, and has animation studios in Kyoto and Osaka.

== Establishment ==
Liden Films was founded on February 22, 2012, and, shortly after, joined joint-holding company Ultra Super Pictures, alongside studios Sanzigen, Trigger, and Ordet. The company is currently represented by Barnum Studio's Tetsurou Satomi.

The company has since expanded, currently consisting of five separate branches and the Suginami branch: Liden Films Kyoto Studio (ライデンフィルム京都スタジオ, Raiden Firumu Kyōto Sutajio), founded in 2015; Liden Films Osaka Studio (ライデンフィルム大阪スタジオ, Raiden Firumu Ōsaka Sutajio), founded in 2013; two Tokyo Studios, Liden Films Tokyo 1st Studio (ライデンフィルム東京第一スタジオ, Raiden Firumu Tōkyō Dai Ichi Sutajio) and Liden Films Tokyo 2nd Studio (ライデンフィルム東京第二スタジオ, Raiden Firumu Tōkyō Dai Ni Sutajio); and Liden Films Fukuya Studio (ライデンフィルム深谷スタジオ, Raiden Firumu Fukuya Sutajio), founded in 2018. In 2016, the Kyoto Studio produced its own series, and in 2020 the Osaka Studio did the same.

== Works ==
=== Television series ===
Title	Director(s)	First run start date	First run end date	Eps	Note(s)
Senyu	Yutaka Yamamoto	January 8, 2013	April 2, 2013	13	Adaptation of the manga series written by Robinson Haruhara. Co-animated with Ordet.
Aiura	Ryōsuke Nakamura	April 10, 2013	June 26, 2013	12	Adaptation of the manga series written by Chama.
Senyu 2	Yutaka Yamamoto	July 2, 2013	September 24, 2013	13	Sequel to Senyu. Co-animated with Ordet.
Miss Monochrome: The Animation	Yoshiaki Iwasaki	October 1, 2013	December 18, 2015	39	Based on an original character created and voiced by Japanese singer and voice actress Yui Horie. Co-animated with Sanzigen.
Wooser's Hand-to-Mouth Life: Awakening Arc	Toyonori Yamada	January 7, 2014	March 25, 2014	12	Sequel to Wooser's Hand-to-Mouth Life. Co-animated with Sanzigen.
Terra Formars	Hiroshi Hamasaki	September 26, 2014	December 19, 2014	13	Adaptation of the manga series written by Yū Sasuga.
The Heroic Legend of Arslan	Noriyuki Abe	April 5, 2015	September 27, 2015	25	Adaptation of the novel series written by Yoshiki Tanaka. Co-animated with Sanzigen.
Yamada-kun and the Seven Witches	Seiki Takuno	April 12, 2015	June 28, 2015	12	Adaptation of the manga series written by Miki Yoshikawa.
Sekkō Boys	Seiki Takuno	January 8, 2016	March 25, 2016	12	Original work.
Schwarzesmarken	Tetsuya Watanabe	January 10, 2016	March 27, 2016	12	Prequel-spin off to Muv-Luv Alternative. Co-animated with ixtl.
Kanojo to Kanojo no Neko: Everything Flows	Kazuya Sakamoto	March 4, 2016	March 25, 2016	4	Based on a Japanese original video animation created and directed by Makoto Shinkai. Animated by Liden Films Kyoto Studio.
Terra Formars: Revenge	Michio Fukuda	April 1, 2016	June 24, 2016	13	Sequel to Terra Formars. Co-animated with TYO Animations.
Berserk	Shin Itagaki	July 1, 2016	June 23, 2017	24	Adaptation of the manga series written by Kentaro Miura. Production cooperation for Millepensee and GEMBA.
The Heroic Legend of Arslan: Dust Storm Dance	Noriyuki Abe	July 3, 2016	August 21, 2017	8	Sequel to The Heroic Legend of Arslan.
Poco's Udon World	Seiki Takuno	October 9, 2016	December 25, 2016	12	Adaptation of the manga series written by Nodoka Shinomaru.
Akashic Records of Bastard Magic Instructor	Hiraku Kaneko (Note: According to animator Masaya Nozaki, who worked with Kaneko on several occasions, Minato Wato is a pseudonym of Kaneko's.)	April 4, 2017	June 20, 2017	12	Adaptation of the light novel series written by Tarō Hitsuji.
Love and Lies	Seiki Takuno	July 4, 2017	September 19, 2017	12	Adaptation of the manga series written by Musawo.
Killing Bites	Yasuto Nishikata	January 13, 2018	March 31, 2018	12	Adaptation of the manga series written by Shinya Murata.
Layton Mystery Tanteisha: Katori no Nazotoki File	Susumu Mitsunaka	April 8, 2018	March 31, 2019	50	Based on Level-5's 2017 video game, Layton's Mystery Journey.
Hanebado!	Shinpei Ezaki	July 2, 2018	October 1, 2018	13	Adaptation of the manga series written by Kōsuke Hamada.
Phantom in the Twilight	Kunihiro Mori	July 10, 2018	September 25, 2018	12	Original work.
Boarding School Juliet	Seiki Takuno	October 6, 2018	December 22, 2018	12	Adaptation of the manga series written by Yōsuke Kaneda.
As Miss Beelzebub Likes	Hiraku Kaneko	October 11, 2018	December 27, 2018	12	Adaptation of the manga series written by matoba.
Magical Girl Spec-Ops Asuka	Hideyo Yamamoto	January 12, 2019	March 30, 2019	12	Adaptation of the manga series written by Makoto Fukami.
Midnight Occult Civil Servants	Tetsuya Watanabe	April 7, 2019	June 23, 2019	12	Adaptation of the manga series written by Yōko Tamotsu.
Magical Sempai	Fumiaki Usui	July 2, 2019	September 17, 2019	12	Adaptation of the manga series written by Azu.
After School Dice Club	Kenichi Imaizumi	October 2, 2019	December 18, 2019	12	Adaptation of the manga series written by Hirō Nakamichi.
Tenka Hyakken ~Meiji-kan e Yōkoso!~	Daisuke Hashimoto	October 13, 2019	December 29, 2019	12	Based on the Tenka Hyakken franchise by Kadokawa.
Rebirth	Shinobu Yoshioka	January 5, 2020	June 30, 2021	50	Based on the Rebirth for you trading card franchise by Bushiroad. Animated by Liden Films Osaka Studio.
Woodpecker Detective's Office	Shinpei Ezaki (Chief); Tomoe Makino	April 13, 2020	June 29, 2020	12	Adaptation of the mystery novel written by Kei Ii.
Otherside Picnic	Takuya Satō	January 4, 2021	March 22, 2021	12	Adaptation of the yuri novel series written by Iori Miyazawa. Co-animated with Felix Film.
Suppose a Kid from the Last Dungeon Boonies Moved to a Starter Town	migmi	January 4, 2021	March 22, 2021	12	Adaptation of the light novel series written by Toshio Satō.
Hortensia Saga	Yasuto Nishikata	January 7, 2021	March 25, 2021	12	Based on the smartphone RPG game by Sega.
Cells at Work! Code Black	Hideyo Yamamoto	January 10, 2021	March 21, 2021	13	Adaptation of the manga series written by Shigemitsu Harada and illustrated by Issei Hatsuyoshi. Spin-off of Cells at Work!.
Farewell, My Dear Cramer	Seiki Takuno	April 4, 2021	June 27, 2021	13	Adaptation of the manga series written by Naoshi Arakawa.
Seven Knights Revolution: Hero Successor	Kazuya Ichikawa	April 5, 2021	June 21, 2021	12	Based on smartphone RPG by Netmarble. Co-animated with Domerica.
Tokyo Revengers	Koichi Hatsumi	April 11, 2021	September 19, 2021	24	Adaptation of the manga series written by Ken Wakui.
"Deji" Meets Girl	Ushio Tazawa	October 2, 2021	December 18, 2021	12	Original work.
Build Divide -#00000 (Code Black)-	Yuki Komada	October 10, 2021	December 26, 2022	12	Based on the Build Divide trading card franchise by Aniplex.
Kaginado	Kazuya Sakamoto	October 13, 2021	June 29, 2022	24	Crossover based on characters from various Key franchises. Animated by Liden Films Kyoto Studio.
Saiyuki Reload: Zeroin	Misato Takada	January 6, 2022	March 31, 2022	13	Remake to Saiyuki Reload Gunlock and the fifth season of the Saiyuki anime.
Tribe Nine	Yū Aoki	January 10, 2022	March 28, 2022	12	Based on the multimedia franchise by Akatsuki and Too Kyo Games.
Salaryman's Club	Aimi Yamauchi	January 30, 2022	April 17, 2022	12	Original work.
Build Divide -#FFFFFF (Code White)-	Yuki Komada	April 3, 2022	June 26, 2022	12	The second cour of Build Divide -#00000 (Code Black)-.
Smile of the Arsnotoria the Animation	Naoyuki Tatsuwa	July 6, 2022	September 21, 2022	12	Based on the smartphone RPG game by Nitroplus.
Call of the Night	Tetsuya Miyanishi (Chief); Tomoyuki Itamura	July 8, 2022	September 30, 2022	13	Adaptation of the manga series written by Kotoyama.
My Master Has No Tail	Hideyo Yamamoto	September 30, 2022	December 23, 2022	13	Adaptation of the manga series written by TNSK.
Reiwa no Di Gi Charat	Hiroaki Sakurai	October 7, 2022	January 3, 2023	16	Based on the mascot franchise by Broccoli.
Eternal Boys	migmi	October 11, 2022	March 28, 2023	24	Original work.
Tokyo Revengers: Christmas Showdown	Koichi Hatsumi	January 8, 2023	April 2, 2023	13	Sequel to Tokyo Revengers.
The Legendary Hero Is Dead!	Rion Kujo	April 7, 2023	June 23, 2023	12	Adaptation of the manga series written by Subaruichi.
Insomniacs After School	Yūki Ikeda	April 11, 2023	July 4, 2023	13	Adaptation of the manga series written by Makoto Ojiro.
Atelier Ryza: Ever Darkness & the Secret Hideout	Ema Yuzuhira	July 2, 2023	September 17, 2023	12	Adaptation of the video game by Koei Tecmo.
Rurouni Kenshin	Hideyo Yamamoto	July 7, 2023	December 15, 2023	24	Adaptation of the manga series written by Nobuhiro Watsuki.
Tokyo Revengers: Tenjiku Arc	Koichi Hatsumi	October 4, 2023	December 27, 2023	13	Sequel to Tokyo Revengers: Christmas Showdown.
Goblin Slayer II	Takaharu Ozaki (Chief); Misato Takada	October 6, 2023	December 22, 2023	12	Sequel to Goblin Slayer: Goblin's Crown by White Fox.
Gods' Games We Play	Tatsuya Shiraishi	April 1, 2024	June 24, 2024	13	Adaptation of the light novel series written by Kei Sazane.
Tonari no Yōkai-san	Aimi Yamauchi	April 7, 2024	June 30, 2024	13	Adaptation of the manga series written by noho.
Bye Bye, Earth	Yasuto Nishikata	July 12, 2024	June 6, 2025	20	Adaptation of the novel series written by Tow Ubukata.
Rurouni Kenshin: Kyoto Disturbance	Yuki Komada	October 4, 2024	March 21, 2025	23	Sequel to Rurouni Kenshin.
Promise of Wizard	Naoyuki Tatsuwa	January 6, 2025	March 24, 2025	12	Based on the smartphone social network game by Coly.
Please Put Them On, Takamine-san	Tomoe Makino	April 2, 2025	June 18, 2025	12	Adaptation of the manga series written by Yuichi Hiiragi.
Detectives These Days Are Crazy!	Rion Kujo	July 1, 2025	September 16, 2025	12	Adaptation of the manga series written by Masakuni Igarashi.
Call of the Night (season 2)	Tomoyuki Itamura	July 4, 2025	September 19, 2025	12	Sequel to Call of the Night.
May I Ask for One Final Thing?	Kazuya Sakamoto	October 4, 2025	December 27, 2025	13	Adaptation of the light novel series written by Nana Ōtori. Animated by Liden Films Kyoto Studio.
Tojima Wants to Be a Kamen Rider	Takahiro Ikezoe	October 5, 2025	March 21, 2026	24	Adaptation of the manga series written by Yokusaru Shibata.
Killed Again, Mr. Detective?	Takashi Naoya	April 3, 2026	June 18, 2026	12	Adaptation of the light novel series written by Teniwoha.
The Classroom of a Black Cat and a Witch	Naoyuki Tatsuwa	April 12, 2026	September 20, 2026	24	Adaptation of the manga series written by Yōsuke Kaneda.
Kaiju Girl Caramelise	Teruyuki Omine	July 3, 2026	September 18, 2026	12	Adaptation of the manga series written by Spica Aoki.
Hanaori-san Still Wants to Fight in the Next Life	Hideyo Yamamoto	July 12, 2026	September 26, 2026	12	Adaptation of the manga series written by Hekiru Hikawa.
Tokyo Revengers: War of the Three Titans Arc	Maki Kodaira	October 3, 2026	TBA	TBA	Sequel to Tokyo Revengers: Tenjiku Arc.
Uncle's Obsession with Cute Things	Tomoe Makino	October 4, 2026	TBA	TBA	Adaptation of the manga series written by Tsutomu.
Dandivine	Yi Cao	October 8, 2026	TBA	TBA	Original work. Co-animated with Kayac Animation.
Historié	TBA	January 2027	TBA	TBA	Adaptation of the manga series written by Hitoshi Iwaaki.
Minami-ke: Korekara	Jun'ichi Kitamura	April 2027	TBA	TBA	Sequel to Minami-ke: Tadaima.

=== Films ===
- New Initial D the Movie - Legend 1: Awakening (August 23, 2014) - co-animated with Sanzigen
- Cardfight!! Vanguard: The Movie (September 13, 2014)
- New Initial D the Movie - Legend 2: Racer (May 23, 2015) - co-animated with Sanzigen
- New Initial D the Movie - Legend 3: Dream (February 6, 2016) - co-animated with Sanzigen
- Monster Strike The Movie (December 12, 2016)
- Happy-Go-Lucky Days (October 23, 2020) - animated by Liden Films Kyoto Studio
- Farewell, My Dear Cramer: First Touch (June 11, 2021)
- Child of Kamiari Month (October 8, 2021)
- Gekijōban SutoPuri Hajimari no Monogatari: Strawberry School Festival!!!! (July 19, 2024)

=== OVAs/ONAs ===
- Terra Formars: Bugs 2 (August 20, 2014 – November 28, 2014) - 2 episodes
- Yamada-kun and the Seven Witches (December 17, 2014 – May 15, 2015) - 2 episodes
- The Heroic Legend of Arslan (May 9, 2016 – November 9, 2016) – 2 episodes
- Monster Sonic! D'Artagnan's Rise to Fame (June 14, 2017 – July 19, 2017) – 5 episodes
- Monster Strike: A Rhapsody Called Lucy -The Very First Song- (2017) – 1 episode; animated by Liden Films Kyoto Studio
- Lost Song (March 31, 2018 – June 16, 2018) – co-production with Dwango, 12 episodes
- Terra Formars: Earth Arc (August 17, 2018 – November 19, 2018) – co-animated with Yumeta Company, 2 episodes
- Love and Lies (November 9, 2018) – 2 episodes
- Midnight Occult Civil Servants (September 25, 2019 – November 22, 2019) – 3 episodes
- Blade of the Immortal -Immortal- (October 10, 2019 – March 25, 2020) – 24 episodes
- Arad Senki: The Wheel of Reversal (April 23, 2020 – July 30, 2020) – 16 episodes
- Kotaro Lives Alone (March 10, 2022) – 10 episodes
- Bastard!! -Heavy Metal, Dark Fantasy- (June 30, 2022 – July 31, 2023) – 39 episodes
- Cat's Eye (September 26, 2025 – January 30, 2026) – 12 episodes
