= Kagewani =

Horror anime series

- Official DVD cover of the series in Japan

影鰐
- Genre: Horror, suspense
- Anime television series
- Directed by: Tomoya Takashima
- Produced by: Kentarō Iwakiri
- Written by: Hiromu Kumamoto
- Studio: Tomovies
- Original network: Tokyo MX, BS11
- Original run: 2 October 2015 – 25 December 2015
- Episodes: 13
- Anime television series

Kagewani: Shō
- Studio: Tomovies
- Original run: 1 April 2016 – 24 June 2016
- Episodes: 13

Kagewani (Japanese: 影鰐; lit. Shadow Crocodile) is a Japanese horror anime television series centered around scientist Sōsuke Banba and his encounters with Unidentified Mysterious Animals or "UMAs". The series of shorts premiered on 2 October 2015 on Tokyo MX and BS11 as part of the Ultra Super Anime Time programming block. The series was simulcast by Crunchyroll. A second season titled Kagewani: Shō aired from 1 April 2016 to 24 June 2016.

== Premise ==
The story begins when cryptids suddenly appear and attack humans. The scientist Sōsuke Banba pursues the truth about these "UMAs".

== Voice cast ==
- Tomokazu Sugita as Sōsuke Banba
- Ryōtarō Okiayu as Masaki Kimura
- Mai Aizawa
- Yukinori Okuhata
- Yûsuke Handa
- Fumiya Kosugi
- Yukiko Morishita

== Episode list ==
=== Season 1 (2015) ===
No.	Title	Original release date
1	"Hack"; Transliteration: "Doba" (Japanese: 駑馬)	2 October 2015
A documentary crew investigates the presence of a cryptid in a sealed off island. Professor Sosuke Banba heads off to investigate the whereabouts of the UMA, but not before encountering a ruined video camera from the chain link fence perimeter.
2	"Ice Fang"; Transliteration: "Hyōga" (Japanese: 氷牙)	9 October 2015
Banba gets called in by the police after a SAR team was able to rescue Mika Kuroda, a known mountaineer and the only survivor of a mountaineering team traveling near the mountain summit to investigate what happened to her father, who went missing while doing a mountain climb.
3	"Return"; Transliteration: "Kikan" (Japanese: 帰還)	16 October 2015
A seaside village is mourning for a missing teenage diver when a giant Kraken-like cryptid shows at the shorefront and wreaks havoc. Villagers kill the creature. Banba reviews photos of its corpse, noting a black fluid he has seen on other cryptid sites. Though the cryptid's body is burned in a firepit, the remains later mysteriously disappear. Two teenage villagers are then attacked by a similar cryptid. Fighting it off with a knife creates wounds revealing the face of a previous victim embedded behind the creature's face.
4	"Diapsid"; Transliteration: "Sōkyū" (Japanese: 双弓)	23 October 2015
Banba heads to the countryside to investigate the possibility of a cryptid presence in the town's sewage system. He rescues two young boys after they accidentally discovered it and were subsequently saved by a HAZMAT team armed with flamethrowers led by scientist Masaki Kimura.
5	"Strange Colour"; Transliteration: "Isai" (Japanese: 異彩)	30 October 2015
Through a glass door, a young convenience store clerk sees his co-worker eaten in the store by a gorilla-sized bipedal cryptid that fades into and out of visibility. As the creature approaches a schoolgirl customer, the surviving clerk pelts it with tomatoes, rendering it partially visible. He flees with the girl, escaping out a window. As they leave the building, people in bio-hazard suits attack the creature with flame-throwers. Days later, Banba shows up to view the store, carrying a photograph of the creature's burnt remains signed by Masaki Kimura of Sarugaku Pharmaceuticals.
6	"Deep Abyss"; Transliteration: "Shin'en" (Japanese: 深淵)	6 November 2015
As a guest on a wedding cruise through the South Pole, Banba recalls a previous conversation with Kimura where the executive requested Banba's help researching the creatures at his company and ends with Banba's refusal stating he is not interested in the creatures for monetary gain. During the cruise the video feed watching the couple, whose proposal took place in a submersible under the water, cuts out. When it returns, the pilot has fainted and the groom is left to pilot the submersible away from an enormous Gill-man-like cryptid with the help of Banba and the crew at the surface. The group in the sub manage to escape due to Banba's quick thinking and the captain relates to Banba that he has seen similar creatures to the one they had witnessed today.
7	"Slashing Strike"; Transliteration: "Setsuzan" (Japanese: 切斬)	13 November 2015
Banba relates an eyewitness account of another strange cryptid seen by a citizen. A teacher cleans up the P.E. field at the end of the day and finds two of her students still outside feeding the school's penned chickens. When she leaves to prepare to lock everything up, the two boys play some more, using poles to draw a picture in the ground. Before they finish, an earthquake occurs caused by a Graboid-like cryptid with a serrated pincer for a mouth that burrows under the earth and rises to attack anything that makes a sound on the ground. The teacher and students are able to distract and elude the creature and escape to the school's roof. From the roof, the children clearly see what they drew on the ground with one boy explaining that what he drew he actually saw in a book given to him by his great-grandfather. The drawing depicts an enormous creature similar to an anglerfish with its tail eerily similar to the worm that had been attacking them.
8	"Camouflage"; Transliteration: "Gitai" (Japanese: 擬態)	20 November 2015
Banba is driving through the mountains with his friend Saori to visit the elementary school from the previous episode. They enter a lighted highway tunnel, where a sudden earth tremor brings down rocks and debris, wrecking the car. Banba finds a semi-conscious Saori in the rubble and drags her to the tunnel's exit. The two collapse just outside the tunnel mouth as an explosion rocks the mountain face. Banba looks on in horror when what he had perceived as Saori's body transforms into the severed tip of a huge tongue. The piece of flesh is evidently part of an enormous monster revealed to be camouflaged as the highway tunnel, its mouth the entrance and its gullet camouflaged as roadway and lighting. A jet war-craft flies by overhead, a possible cause for the explosion.
9	"Flytrap"; Transliteration: "Kowaku" (Japanese: 蠱惑)	27 November 2015
Banba watches police interrogating a young man who claims he was taken to an abandoned industrial greenhouse by some bullies. They are disturbed by the wild plant growth in the building, and find what appears to be a person embedded in a vegetal sac. The humanoid figure falls out of the sac and animated vines begin to attack the group. Those with flashlights find that light repels the vines, but batteries run out and all except the single witness succumb to the vines. At the site the next day, the police find only desiccated corpses. After the interview, Banba concludes that the young man is responsible for the deaths. Kimura appears with a team that captures the witness, now clearly non-human.
10	"Shadow Crocodile"; Transliteration: "Kagewani" (Japanese: 影鰐)	4 December 2015
A woman in a rustic fishing boat is attacked and beheaded by a crocodile shadow. In the village, a meeting of men folk discusses the potential threat of a monster attack as predicted by a hooded traveler. Some agree to flee, others to stay. The traveler rides out with a fisherman, seeking the crocodile monster. As a large shadow appears to swim toward them, the traveler produces a shotgun. When the creature attacks, the traveler loses an arm protecting the fisherman. Returning to the village, the fisherman leads the shadow until the entire shadow is on one ship's sail. He throws an oil lantern at the sail and the traveler fires, drenching the sail in oil and flames. The monster shadow is consumed, disappearing with a roar.
11	"Encounter"; Transliteration: "Sōgū" (Japanese: 遭遇)	11 December 2015
Banba reminisces about being locked in an outbuilding while his parents out front plan to release him in a couple of hours. Townspeople see shadows creeping out from the surrounding forest, similar in shape to the previous episode's shadow Shark. The monster shadows attack and kill townsfolk, including both his parents. One enters the building in which he now hides. As it attacks him, a woman shoots at the shadow with a shotgun, driving it away. She also excises contamination from the small bite he suffered to his head.
12	"Pitch Black"; Transliteration: "Shikkoku" (Japanese: 漆黒)	18 December 2015
At a pharmaceutical plant, Banba and Kimura talk while descending into a large underground lab. They speak of the origin of the shadow monsters, created by ancient warring tribes to bring peace. The first monster destroyed the two originating tribes. Though it is now gone, its cells remain, infecting animals of all sorts in the modern world. These infected animal become new monsters dubbed Kagewani. In the lab the two men see a newly-produced clone shadow monster, an offspring from the sewer monster seen before, and the part-plant young man from an earlier episode. The escaping sewer monster gores Banba, frightening Kimura into running alone into the lab's safety cell.
13	"His Highness Returns"; Transliteration: "Kangyo" (Japanese: 還御)	25 December 2015
Rescuers cut into the lab's safety cell, releasing Kimura unharmed. Banba has survived. though surveillance video shows the shadow monster clone entering Banba's old scar. In the operating room, a shadow monster grows out of Banba. Kimura orders his capture, but when the team arrives the medical staff are dead and Banba is gone. Banba confronts Kimura in the underground lab, attacks him using the shadow monster within him, and leaves the facility. He meets the woman with the shotgun from earlier episodes, now aged. She warns him she will kill him when the Kagewani takes him over. He walks away into the city.

=== Season 2 (2016) ===
No. overall	No. in season	Title	Original release date
14	1	"Quickening"; Transliteration: "Taidō" (Japanese: 胎動)	1 April 2016
15	2	"Pursuit"; Transliteration: "Tsuikō" (Japanese: 追行)	8 April 2016
16	3	"Secret Ceremony"; Transliteration: "Higi" (Japanese: 秘儀)	15 April 2016
17	4	"Trial"; Transliteration: "Shiren" (Japanese: 試練)	22 April 2016
18	5	"Collision"; Transliteration: "Shōtotsu" (Japanese: 衝突)	29 April 2016
19	6	"Blindness"; Transliteration: "Shitsumei" (Japanese: 失明)	6 May 2016
20	7	"Isolation"; Transliteration: "Kodoku" (Japanese: 孤独)	13 May 2016
21	8	"Memories"; Transliteration: "Kioku" (Japanese: 記憶)	20 May 2016
22	9	"Feed"; Transliteration: "Ejiki" (Japanese: 餌食)	27 May 2016
23	10	"Dream Demon"; Transliteration: "Muma" (Japanese: 夢魔)	3 June 2016
24	11	"Evolution"; Transliteration: "Shinka" (Japanese: 進化)	10 June 2016
25	12	"The Final Battle"; Transliteration: "Kessen" (Japanese: 決戦)	17 June 2016
26	13	"The Final Chapter"; Transliteration: "Shūkyoku" (Japanese: 終局)	24 June 2016

== Production ==
The series is directed by Tomoya Takashima and written by Hiromu Kumamoto, with animation by animation studio Tomovies. Character designs for the series are provided by Ami Fujikawa and Ryōma Hori, and the monster designs are provided Shunsaku Matsurida. Tsutomu Nagae and Kentarō Iwakiri are producing the series. The series' theme song is "Arrival of Fear" by M.S.S Project.
