= Metal Walker =

1999 video game

- North American cover art
- Developer(s): Capcom
- Publisher(s): Capcom
- Artist(s): Takao Aoki
- Platform(s): Game Boy Color
- Release: JP: December 24, 1999; NA: February 6, 2001
- Genre(s): Role-playing
- Mode(s): Single-player, multiplayer

Metal Walker, known as Bakusou Senki Metal Walker GB: Kotetsu no Yuujou (爆走戦記 メタルウォーカーGB 鋼鉄の友情, lit. "Roaring Chronicle Metal Walker GB: Steel Friendship") in Japan, is a role-playing video game for the Game Boy Color, developed and published by Capcom. Many critics likened the game to the Pokémon series, but praised the game's unique qualities. In Japan, the game inspired merchandise based on the Metal Walker robots.

Metal Walker's battles are unique from other games in the genre due to their billiard-style nature. Players move their Metal Walkers across the battlefield by hitting them into items, walls, or enemy Metal Walkers.

The 2013 mobile game Monster Strike has a similar concept and gameplay mechanics but is otherwise unconnected to Metal Walker.

== Gameplay ==
Although Metal Walker is a console RPG, battles are fought in a pinball or billiards-like atmosphere in a top-down perspective arena. As each turn of the battle starts, players decide which direction a Metal Walker will move and how hard they will move. Players are encouraged to form strategies that allow Metal Walkers to hit a single enemy, bounce off a wall, and then hit another enemy, all in a single turn. On the battlefield, players can throw several different types of items onto the field. The items are used when a Metal Walker hits them. Capsules and healing items strengthen and heal Metal Walkers, whereas attack items, such as Napalm, are only useful when the enemy hits them. There also exist Analyzers, which provide the player with Scan Data for any Metal Walker that is bounced into them. Scrap metal won after the battle can then be used with the Scan Data to create new Metal Walkers or purchase items. When an enemy is destroyed, the player's Metal Walker will gain experience points and an item might be obtained. If the player's Metal Walker runs out of Hit points, the player will lose half of the carried scraps and have to start from the last save point.

Outside of battle, players explore a top-down overworld where they can explore various towns and dungeons. Most battles occur as random encounters. The overworld has several interactable elements, such as water, which the player needs a certain number of Cores to cross. The player can only carry one Metal Walker at a time and it will follow the main character on the overworld. By defeating the game's bosses, players earn Core Units, which allow Metal Walkers to evolve into new, stronger forms.

== Plot ==
Metal Walker takes place late in the 21st Century when a valuable and evolving metal known as Core is discovered on an island. Military leaders sought to use Core to develop weapons, but an accident turned the island into a ruined wasteland. The Rusted Land, as it is called, is where the game takes place. Because of the research, the island is scattered with malicious robots known as Metal Busters. Fifty years after the accident, the main character and his father Tetsuo Kurama have devoted their lives to search for lost Core Units on the island, but the game opens as the father is separated from his son as a gang of Metal Busters attack. The main character and his Metal Walker, Meta Ball, must then search for his father on the island. Professor Hawk, Tetsuo's employer tells the main character that his father will be found where there are Core Units, so he then goes to seek them out.

== Reception ==
Typical battle scenario

Metal Walker found praise among its critics, particularly for the game's unique "science fiction spin" on the Pokémon series. Game Rankings holds an aggregated review score of 83% based on 7 reviews. Gerald Valloria of GameSpot.com said of the game that "Metal Walker is a more than worthwhile endeavor for anyone that is in between Pokémon games, and it can serve as an alternative for those fans of RPGs that might be too ashamed to look someone in the eye and say, "Yeah, I'm playing Pokémon, what of it?" The game earned a three out of five in Nintendo Power.

Although calling the game "fun" and "engaging", GamePro called the game a "shameless Pokémon rip-off." A review by Gamebits.net gave the game a lower than average score, calling it an RPG that's "more mathematical than magical."
