= Sekkō Boys =

2016 Anime TV series produced by Liden films

石膏ボーイズ (Sekkō Bōizu)
- Anime television series
- Directed by: Tomoki Takuno
- Written by: Michiko Yokote
- Studio: Liden Films
- Original network: Tokyo MX, BS11, AT-X
- Original run: January 8, 2016 – March 25, 2016
- Episodes: 12

Sekkou Boys (Japanese: 石膏ボーイズ, Hepburn: Sekkō Bōizu; lit. "Plaster Boys") is a Japanese anime television series produced by Liden Films. It aired between January 8 and March 25, 2016. The ending theme is "Hoshizora Rendezvous" (星空ランデブー, Hoshizora Rendevū) by Sekkō Boys, a unit composed of the four main voice actors: Tomokazu Sugita, Shinnosuke Tachibana, Jun Fukuyama and Daisuke Ono.

== Plot ==
The series follows four Greco-Roman gypsum busts: Saint Giorgio, Medici, Hermes and Mars, who form an idol unit managed by Miki Ishimoto, a rookie art school graduate.

== Characters ==
Miki Ishimoto (石本 美希, Ishimoto Miki)
Voiced by: Shiho Kokido
Mira Hanayashiki (花屋敷 ミラ, Hanayashiki Mira)
Voiced by: Yui Makino
Saint Giorgio (聖ジョルジョ, Sei Jorujo)
Voiced by: Tomokazu Sugita
Medici (メディチ, Medichi)
Voiced by: Shinnosuke Tachibana
Hermes (ヘルメス, Herumesu)
Voiced by: Jun Fukuyama
Mars (マルス, Marusu)
Voiced by: Daisuke Ono
Hanzō Horibe (堀部 半蔵, Horibe Hanzō)
Voiced by: Takaya Kuroda
Kinue Yamashita (山下 絹枝, Yamashita Kinue)
Voiced by: Rena Maeda
Hironori Yanagisawa (柳沢 宏典, Yanagisawa Hironori)
Voiced by: Takahiro Sakurai
Athena (アテナ, Atena)
Voiced by: Akiko Kimura
Thousand Armed Kannon (三十三間走り隊, Sanjūsangen Hashiritai) (ep. 8)
Voiced by: Yū Kobayashi
