= 2013 in anime =

Events in 2013 in anime.

== Accolades ==
Internationally, Patema Inverted and The Wind Rises were nominated for the Asia Pacific Screen Award for Best Animated Feature Film. The Wind Rises was also in competition for the Golden Lion at the 70th Venice International Film Festival. The Wind Rises won the New York Film Critics Circle Award for Best Animated Film and was nominated for the Golden Globe Award for Best Foreign Language Film. The Wind Rises and A Letter to Momo have been nominated for the Annie Award for Best Animated Feature at the 41st Annie Awards. The Wind Rises has also been nominated for the Academy Award for Best Animated Feature and Possessions has been nominated for the Academy Award for Best Animated Short Film at the 86th Academy Awards.

== Releases ==
=== Films ===
A list of anime that debuted in theaters between January 1 and December 31, 2013.

Release date	Title	Studio	Director	Running time (minutes)	Notes	Ref
March 2	Death Billiards	Madhouse	Yuzuru Tachikawa	25		
March 2	Little Witch Academia	Trigger	Yoh Yoshinari	26		
March 15	Shimajirō to Fufu no Daibōken: Sukue! Nanairo no Hana	Benesse Corporation	Isamu Hirabayashi	60		
March 30	Dragon Ball Z: Battle of Gods	Toei Animation	Masahiro Hosoda	85		
March 30	Hanasaku Iroha: The Movie – Home Sweet Home	P.A. Works	Masahiro Andō	66		
April 13	Aura: Koga Maryuin's Last War	AIC ASTA	Seiji Kishi	83		
July 20	The Wind Rises	Studio Ghibli	Hayao Miyazaki	126		
October 26	Puella Magi Madoka Magica the Movie: Rebellion	Shaft	Akiyuki Shinbo; Yukihiro Miyamoto	130		
November 23	Persona 3 The Movie: #1 Spring of Birth	AIC ASTA	Noriaki Akitaya, Tomohisa Taguchi	98		

=== Television series ===
A list of anime television series that debuted between January 1 and December 31, 2013.

First run start and end dates	Title	Episodes	Studio	Director	Alternate title	Ref
January 2 – March 27	Mangirl!	13	Doga Kobo	Nobuaki Nakanishi		
January 3 – March 28	Ai Mai Mi	13	Seven	Itsuki Imazaki		
January 3 – March 21	Encouragement of Climb	12	8-Bit	Yusuke Yamamoto	Yama no Susume	
January 4 – March 22	Cuticle Detective Inaba	12	Zexcs	Susumu Nitsukawa	Cuticle Tantei Inaba	
January 5 – March 30	AKB0048 next stage	13	Satelight	Shōji Kawamori; Yoshimasa Hiraike		
January 5 – March 30	Da Capo III	13	Kazami Gakuen Kōshiki Dōga-bu	Ken'ichi Ishikura		
January 5 – March 30	Hakkenden: Eight Dogs of the East	13	Studio Deen	Mitsue Yamazaki	Hakkenden: Tōhō Hakken Ibun	
January 5 – March 30	Maoyu	12	Arms	Takeo Takahashi	Maoyū Maō Yūsha	
January 6 – March 24	Ishida & Asakura	12	Dax Production; Hotline	Pippuya		
January 6 – March 31	Love Live!	13	Sunrise	Takahiko Kyōgoku		
January 6 – March 30	Minami-ke: Tadaima	13	Feel	Keiichiro Kawaguchi		
January 6 – March 31	Oreshura	13	A-1 Pictures	Kanta Kamei		
January 6 – March 24	Senran Kagura	12	Animation Studio Artland	Takashi Watanabe		
January 7 – March 25	Amnesia	12	Brain's Base	Yoshimitsu Ohashi		
January 7 – March 26	Bakumatsu Gijinden Roman	12	TMS Entertainment	Hirofumi Ogura		
January 7 – March 25	Unlimited Psychic Squad	12	Manglobe	Shishō Igarashi	The Unlimited: Hyōbu Kyōsuke	
January 8 – April 2	Senyu	12	Liden Films; Ordet	Yutaka Yamamoto		
January 9 – March 27	Silver Spoon (season 2)	11	A-1 Pictures	Tomohiko Itō; Kotomi Deai	Gin no Saji	
January 10 – March 28	GJ Club	12	Doga Kobo	Yoshiyuki Fujiwara	GJ-bu	
January 10 – March 28	Tamako Market	12	Kyoto Animation	Naoko Yamada		
January 11 – June 28	Chihayafuru 2	25	Madhouse	Morio Asaka		
January 11 – March 29	Haganai NEXT	12	AIC Build	Toru Kitahata	Boku wa Tomodachi ga Sukunai Next	
January 11 – March 29	Kotoura-san	12	AIC Classic	Masahiko Ohta		
January 11 – March 15	Problem Children Are Coming from Another World, Aren't They?	10	Diomedéa	Keizō Kusakawa; Yasutaka Yamamoto	Mondaiji-tachi ga Isekai Kara Kuru Sō Desu yo?	
January 11 – March 29	Sasami-san@Ganbaranai	12	Shaft	Akiyuki Shinbo		
January 11 – March 29	Vividred Operation	12	A-1 Pictures	Kazuhiro Takamura		
January 13 – September 29	Beast Saga	38	SynergySP	Katsumi Ono		
January 13 – March 2, 2014	Cardfight!! Vanguard: Link Joker	59	TMS Entertainment	Hatsuki Tsuji		
February 3 – January 26, 2014	DokiDoki! PreCure	49	Toei Animation	Gō Koga		
February 6 – April 24	Straight Title Robot Anime	12		Kōtarō Ishidate; Toru Nakano		
March 16 – June 1	Red Data Girl	12	P.A. Works	Toshiya Shinohara	RDG Red Data Girl	
April 2 – June 25	DD Fist of the North Star	13	Ajia-do Animation Works	Akitaro Daichi		
April 3 – June 26	Karneval	13	Manglobe	Eiji Suganuma		
April 3 – June 26	Uta no Prince-sama Maji LOVE 2000%	13	A-1 Pictures	Yuu Kou; Yūki Ukai		
April 3 – December 25	Little Battlers eXperience WARS	37	OLM, Inc.	Naohito Takahashi	Danbōru senki Wōzu	
April 4 – June 27	Devil Survivor 2: The Animation	13	Bridge	Seiji Kishi		
April 4 – June 27	The Devil Is a Part-Timer!	13	White Fox	Naoto Hosoda	Hataraku Maō-sama!	
April 4 – September 19	Majestic Prince	24	Doga Kobo; Orange	Keitaro Motonaga		
April 4 – June 27	The Severing Crime Edge	13	Studio Gokumi	Yūji Yamaguchi	Dansai Bunri no Crime Edge	
April 5 – June 21	Samurai Bride	12	Arms	KOBUN	Hyakka Ryōran	
April 5 – June 29	The Flowers of Evil	13	Zexcs	Hiroshi Nagahama	Aku no Hana	
April 5 – June 28	My Youth Romantic Comedy Is Wrong, As I Expected	13	Brain's Base	Ai Yoshimura	Yahari Ore no Seishun Love Comedy wa Machigatteiru.	
April 5 – June 28	Photo Kano	13	Madhouse	Akitoshi Yokoyama		
April 6 – December 28, 2013	Baku Tech! Bakugan Gachi	39	Shogakukan Music & Digital Entertainment	Junji Nishimura		
April 6 – February 7, 2015	Danchi Tomoo	78	Shogakukan Music & Digital Entertainment	Ayumu Watanabe		
April 6 – June 22	Date A Live	12	AIC Plus+	Keitaro Motonaga		
April 6 – March 29, 2014	Duel Masters Victory V3	51		Takao Kato		
April 6 – June 29	Haitai Nanafa	13	Passione	Hiroshi Kimura		
April 6 – March 29, 2014	Jewelpet Happiness	52	Studio Comet	Hiroaki Sakurai		
April 6 – July 7	Leviathan: The Last Defense	13	Gonzo	Kenichi Yatani	Zettai Bōei Leviathan	
April 6 – June 29	Muromi-san	13	Tatsunoko Production	Tatsuya Yoshihara	Namiuchigiwa no Muromi-san	
April 6 – March 29, 2014	Pretty Rhythm: Rainbow Live	51	Tatsunoko Production	Masakazu Hishida		
April 6 – March 30, 2014	Tanken Driland: Sennen no Mahō	51	Toei Animation	Toshinori Fukuzawa		
April 7 – September 29	Attack on Titan	25	Wit Studio	Tetsurō Araki	Shingeki no Kyojin	
April 7 – June 30	Gargantia on the Verdurous Planet	13	Production I.G	Kazuya Murata	Suisei no Gargantia	
April 7 – June 30	Ore no Imōto ga Konna ni Kawaii Wake ga Nai.	13	A-1 Pictures	Hiroyuki Kanbe		
April 7 – June 30	Yondemasuyo, Azazel-san Z	13	Production I.G	Tsutomu Mizushima		
April 8 – July 1	Haiyore! Nyaruko-san W	12	Xebec	Tsuyoshi Nagasawa		
April 8 – July 1	Hayate the Combat Butler: Cuties	12	Manglobe	Masashi Kudo		
April 8 – September 30	Mushibugyo	26	Seven Arcs Pictures	Takayuki Hamana		
April 9 – July 1	Arata: The Legend	12	Satelight; JM Animation	Kenji Yasuda; Woo Hyun Park	Arata Kangatari	
April 9 – June 25	Sparrow's Hotel	12	Hotline	Tetsuji Nakamura		
April 9 – June 26	Yuyushiki	12	Kinema Citrus	Kaori		
April 10 – June 26	Aiura	12	Liden Films	Ryōsuke Nakamura		
April 12 – September 27, 2013	A Certain Scientific Railgun S	24	J.C.Staff	Tatsuyuki Nagai	Toaru Kagaku no Railgun S	
April 12 – June 28	Valvrave the Liberator	12	Sunrise	Kō Matsuo	Kakumeiki Valvrave	
April 13 – June 29	The "Hentai" Prince and the Stony Cat.	12	J.C.Staff	Yōhei Suzuki	Hentai Ōji to Warawanai Neko.	
June 8 – March 1, 2014	Kingdom (season 2)	39	Pierrot	Jun Kamiya		
July 1 – September 16	Dog & Scissors	12	Gonzo	Yukio Takahashi	Inu to Hasami wa Tsukaiyō	
July 2 – September 17	Brothers Conflict	12	Brain's Base	Atsushi Matsumoto		
July 2 – December 17	Gifū Dōdō!! Kanetsugu to Keiji	25	Studio Deen	Bob Shirahata		
July 2 – September 24	Senyu (season 2)	12	Liden Films; Ordet	Yutaka Yamamoto		
July 3 – September 18	Tamayura: More Aggressive	12	TYO Animations	Junichi Sato		
July 4 – October 11	Chronicles of the Going Home Club	12	Nomad	Hikaru Sato	Kitakubu Katsudō Kiroku	
July 4 – September 26	Danganronpa: The Animation	13	Lerche	Seiji Kishi		
July 4 – September 26	Free!	12	Kyoto Animation; Animation Do	Hiroko Utsumi		
July 4 – September 26	Rozen Maiden: Zurückspulen	13	Studio Deen	Mamoru Hatekayama		
July 4 – September 26	Senki Zesshō Symphogear G	13	Satelight	Katsumi Ono		
July 4 – September 26	Stella Women's Academy, High School Division Class C³	13	Gainax	Masayoshi Kawajiri		
July 5 – September 27	Love Lab	13	Doga Kobo	Masahiko Ohta		
July 5 – September 27	Ro-Kyu-Bu! SS	13	Project No. 9	Tetsuya Yanagisawa		
July 5 – September 27	Servant × Service	13	A-1 Pictures	Yasutaka Yamamoto		
July 6 – September 28	Day Break Illusion	13	AIC	Keizō Kusakawa	Gen'ei o Kakeru Taiyō	
July 6 – September 21	Kin-iro Mosaic	12	Studio Gokumi	Tensho		
July 6 – September 21	Sunday Without God	12	Madhouse	Yūji Kumazawa	Kami-sama no Inai Nichiyōbi	
July 7 – September 8	Blood Lad	10	Brain's Base	Shigeyuki Miya		
July 7 – September 22	Devils and Realist	12	Doga Kobo	Chiaki Kon	Makai Ōji: Devils and Realist	
July 7 – September 22	Teekyu (season 2)	12	MAPPA	Shin Itagaki		
July 7 – September 29	The Eccentric Family	13	P.A. Works	Masayuki Yoshihara	Uchōten Kazoku	
July 7 – September 28	Fantasista Doll	12	Hoods Entertainment	Hisashi Saitō		
July 7 – September 29	Genshiken: Second Season	13	Production I.G	Tsutomu Mizushima		
July 7 – September 22	High School DxD New	12	TNK	Tetsuya Yanagisawa		
July 8 – September 29	Hakkenden: Eight Dogs of the East (season 2)	13	Studio Deen	Mitsue Yamazaki	Hakkenden: Tōhō Hakken Ibun	
July 8 – September 23	No Matter How I Look at It, It's You Guys' Fault I'm Not Popular!	12	Silver Link	Shin Ōnuma	Watashi ga Motenai no wa Dō Kangaetemo Omaera ga Warui!	
July 8 – September 23	Recorder to Randoseru Mi	12	Seven	Hiroshi Kimura		
July 8 – September 23	The World God Only Knows: Goddesses	12	Manglobe	Satoshi Ōsedo	Kami nomi zo Shiru Sekai: Megami-hen	
July 12 – September 27	Gatchaman Crowds	12	Tatsunoko Production	Kenji Nakamura		
July 12 – September 27	Hyperdimension Neptunia: The Animation	12	David Production	Masahiro Mukai		
July 13 – September 14	Fate/kaleid liner Prisma Illya	10	Silver Link	Shin Ōnuma; Takashi Sakamoto; Miki Minato		
July 13 – September 28	Futari wa Milky Holmes	12	J.C.Staff; Nomad	Hiroshi Nishikiori		
September 13 – December 13	Super Seisyun Brothers	14	AIC PLUS+	Masahiro Takata		
September 13 – September 28	A Town Where You Live	12	Gonzo	Shigeyasu Yamauchi		
September 16 – December 9	Diabolik Lovers	12	Zexcs	Shinobu Tagashira		
September 22 – September 21, 2014	Battle Spirits: Saikyou Ginga Ultimate Zero	49	Sunrise	Masaki Watanabe		
September 1 – December 24	Miss Monochrome	13	Liden Films; Sanzigen	Yoshiaki Iwasaki		
October 2 – December 18	Beyond the Boundary	12	Kyoto Animation	Taichi Ishidate	Kyōkai no Kanata	
October 2 – December 25	Coppelion	13	GoHands	Shingo Suzuki		
October 2 – October 1, 2014	Gaist Crusher	51	Pierrot	Yoshihiro Takamoto		
October 2 – December 25	Kyōsōgiga	10	Toei Animation	Rie Matsumoto		
October 3 – March 29, 2015	Ace of Diamond	75	Madhouse; Production I.G	Mitsuyuki Masuhara	Daiya no A	
October 3 – March 27, 2014	Golden Time	24	J.C.Staff	Chiaki Kon		
October 3 – April 3, 2014	Nagi-Asu: A Lull in the Sea	26	P.A. Works	Toshiya Shinohara	Nagi no Asukara	
October 3 – December 19	Outbreak Company	12	Feel	Kei Oikawa		
October 3 – March 28, 2014	Strike the Blood	24	Silver Link; Connect	Takao Sano; Hideyo Yamamoto		
October 4 – December 20	Freezing Vibration	12	A.C.G.T	Takashi Watanabe		
October 4 – December 20	Infinite Stratos 2	12	8-Bit	Susumu Tosaka; Yasuhito Kikuchi		
October 4 – March 28, 2014	Kill la Kill	24	Trigger	Hiroyuki Imaishi		
October 5 – March 29, 2014	Hajime no Ippo: Rising	25	Madhouse; MAPPA	Jun Shishido		
October 5 – December 21	I Couldn't Become a Hero, So I Reluctantly Decided to Get a Job	12	Asread	Kinji Yoshimoto	Yūsha ni Narenakatta Ore wa Shibushibu Shūshoku o Ketsui Shimashita.	
October 5 – December 28	Little Busters! Refrain	13	J.C.Staff	Yoshinobu Yamakawa		
October 5 – March 22, 2014	Log Horizon	25	Satelight	Shinji Ishihira		
October 5 – December 29	Tesagure! Bukatsu-mono	12	Yaoyorozu	Kōtarō Ishidate		
October 6 – December 22	Gingitsune	12	Diomedéa	Shin Misawa		
October 6 – March 30, 2014	Kuroko's Basketball (season 2)	25	Production I.G	Shunsuke Tada	Kuroko no Basuke	
October 6 – March 30, 2014	Magi: The Kingdom of Magic	25	A-1 Pictures	Koji Masunari		
October 6 – December 22	Meganebu!	12	Studio Deen	Soubi Yamamoto		
October 6 – March 23, 2014	Phi Brain: Puzzle of God (season 3)	25	Sunrise	Junichi Sato		
October 6 – December 22	Walkure Romanze	12	8-Bit	Yūsuke Yamamoto		
October 6 – December 22	Wanna Be the Strongest in the World	12	Arms	Rion Kujo	Sekai de Ichiban Tsuyoku Naritai!	
October 6 – December 22	Teekyu (season 3)	12	MAPPA	Shin Itagaki		
October 6 – December 29	White Album 2	13	Satelight	Masaomi Andō		
October 6 – January 1, 2014	Yozakura Quartet: Hana no Uta	13	Tatsunoko Production	Ryochimo Sawa		
October 7 – December 23	Arpeggio of Blue Steel: Ars Nova	12	Sanzigen	Seiji Kishi		
October 7 – March 31, 2014	Gundam Build Fighters	25	Sunrise	Kenji Nagasaki		
October 7 – December 23	Non Non Biyori	12	Silver Link	Shin'ya Kawatsura		
October 7 – December 23	Unbreakable Machine-Doll	12	Lerche	Kinji Yoshimoto	Machine-Doll wa Kizutsukanai	
October 7 – July 1, 2014	Yowamushi Pedal	38	TMS/8PAN	Osamu Nabeshima		
October 8 – December 24	BlazBlue Alter Memory	12	TeamKG; Hoods Entertainment	Hideki Tachibana		
October 9 – March 26, 2014	Tokyo Ravens	24	8-Bit	Takaomi Kanasaki		
October 10 – December 19	Galilei Donna	11	A-1 Pictures	Yasuomi Umetsu		
October 10 – December 12	Noucome	10	Diomedéa	Takayuki Inagaki	Ore no Nōnai Sentakushi ga, Gakuen Rabu Kome o Zenryoku de Jama Shiteiru	
October 10 – March 27, 2014	Samurai Flamenco	22	Manglobe	Takahiro Omori		
October 10 – December 26	Valvrave the Liberator (season 2)	12	Sunrise	Kō Matsuo	Kakumeiki Valvrave	
December 20 – March 28, 2014	Pupipō!	15	AIC Plus+	Kaoru Suzuki		

=== Original video animations ===
A list of original video animations that debuted between January 1 and December 31, 2013.

First run start and end dates	Title	Episodes	Studio	Director	Alternate title	Ref
June 19	Future Diary: Redial	1	Asread	Akira Iwanaga	Mirai Nikki: Redial	
July 22 – August 26, 2015	Ghost in the Shell: Arise	5	Production I.G	Kazuchika Kise		
July 24	Corpse Party: Tortured Souls	4	Asread	Akira Iwanaga		

== Highest-grossing films ==
The following are the 10 highest-grossing anime films of 2013 by Japan gross are as follows:

Rank	Title	Gross (Japan)	Ref.
1	The Wind Rises	$119,513,192	
2	One Piece Film: Z	$72,822,122	
3	Doraemon: Nobita's Secret Gadget Museum	$37,229,132	
4	Detective Conan: Private Eye in the Distant Sea	$36,054,366	
5	Pokémon the Movie: Genesect and the Legend Awakened	$30,906,537	
6	Dragon Ball Z: Battle of Gods	$29,947,013	
7	The Tale of the Princess Kaguya	$22,693,504	
8	Puella Magi Madoka Magica the Movie: Rebellion	$19,169,007	
9	Gintama: The Movie: The Final Chapter: Be Forever Yorozuya	$15,786,182	
10	Crayon Shin-chan: Very Tasty! B-class Gourmet Survival!!	$12,572,797	

== See also ==
- 2013 in Japanese television
- 2013 in British television
- 2013 in Wales
- 2013 in Mexican television
- 2013 in Spanish television
- 2013 in Catalonia
- 2013 in animation
- 2013 in manga
- 2013 in television
