= List of Kannagi: Crazy Shrine Maidens chapters =

The cover of the first tankōbon of the Kannagi: Crazy Shrine Maidens manga released in Japan by Ichijinsha on August 9, 2006

Kannagi: Crazy Shrine Maidens is a Japanese manga series written and illustrated by Eri Takenashi. It has been serialized in the Ichijinsha's Comic Rex since December 9, 2005. The plot follows the adventures of Jin Mikuriya, who releases Nagi, a guardian deity, from a statue, and Nagi and Jin's attempts to "purify" the world.

Ichijinsha is collecting the series in tankōbon. The first volume was released on August 9, 2006, and as of August 2, 2014, ten volumes have been released. Each volume comes bundled with a pin-up drawn in a collaboration between Takenashi and other prominent artists. The series was adapted into an anime by A-1 Pictures. Directed by Yutaka Yamamoto, the series ran between October 4 and December 27, 2008. Bandai Entertainment licensed the manga for distribution in North America. They released the first three volumes in the series, however further releases were canceled by Bandai Entertainment's restructuring of itself in 2012.

The manga went into hiatus after Eri Takenashi developed a Subarachnoid hemorrhage in early November 2008. The manga resumed with the September 2011 issue of Comic Rex on July 27, 2011, but due to ongoing concerns for her health, Takenashi warned in a June 24, 2011 post on her blog that the series' publishing schedule would be irregular, though her goal was for a bi-monthly release.

== Volume list ==
No.	Original release date	Original ISBN	English release date	English ISBN
01	August 9, 2006	978-4-7580-6015-8	June 7, 2011	978-1-60496-267-3
Act 001. "Himorogi's Daughter"; Act 002. "The Emperor's Voice was Heard"; Act 003. "Spring Attack!"; Act 004. "School Days"; Act 005. "The After-School Goddess"; Act 006. "Sister"; Pin-up Collaborator: Takashi Takeuchi (of Type-Moon)
Jin Mikuriya, a high school student, builds a small statue out of wood, but before he can bring it to school and turn it in, a girl breaks out of the statue. She introduces herself as the guardian deity of the land. When she discovers that the root of her power, a tree on the land of a Shinto shrine, has been cut down, she panics. However, when Jin is able to remove an impurity from her body, she recruits him to help her purify the land. After searching for more impurities, she is introduced to Jin's childhood friend, Tsugumi Aoba, and to Jin's school. Later, she meets her sister, Zange, and they begin to compete for support.
02	February 9, 2007	978-4-7580-6042-4	September 28, 2011	978-1-60496-268-0
Act 007. "Sisters"; Act 008. "The Fiery Devils for Hire x 2 + 1"; Act 009. "We Love Thou, Our Idol"; Act 010. "Revelation! A New Power!!"; Intermission: "Nagi-tan's Exciting Shopping Experience"; Act 011. "That Girl is Crazy"; Act 012. "Wuthering Heights"; Ending. "Omake"; Pin-up Collaborator: Ryukishi07 (of 07th Expansion)
Zange reveals that she has possessed the body of Hakua Suzushiro and subdues Nagi, promising to defeat her older sister. Jin's timely arrival saves Nagi. While eating breakfast, both Tsugumi and Zange arrive, and the three girls vie for Jin's attention. Jin discovers a fan site and a corresponding fan club devoted to Nagi, and with the support of the students, Nagi becomes a student at Jin's school. Reiri Suzushiro, a teacher at the school, reveals himself as the father of Hakua. Nagi later gets a job to pay for her clothing and amenities, but after being discovered by Jin, she quits.
03	August 9, 2007	978-4-7580-6065-3	December 21, 2011	978-1-60496-269-7
Act 013. "Run Astray Campus Comedy"; Act 014. "Shameful Past of Mine"; Intermission: "Karaoke-Warrior-Mike Takako"; Act 015. "Everything's Iffy"; Act 016. "But Really..."; Act 017. "Ephemeral"; Act 018. "Warm and Spooky Jin"; Pin-up Collaborator: Itaru Hinoue (of Key)
After being carried home by Daitetsu Hibiki, a member of the Art Club, Nagi yells at Jin when he asks her what happened. When the Art Club and Tsugumi begin to investigate, they accidentally cause a rumor that Daitetsu and Jin are in love to spread. After Tsugumi confessing her mistake to Zange, Zange declares that she will become Jin's girlfriend. Her arrival at Jin's household results in Tsugumi and Jin apologizing to each other for their past mistakes. Later, Jin attempts to dig into Nagi's past, which causes Nagi to fly into a rage and run away when she cannot remember. They make up after Jin finds her and reassures her, and they begin to unearth Nagi's memories together. However, a misunderstanding arises after Jin trips over Nagi and Tsugumi walks in, witnessing the pair in a compromising position.
04	February 9, 2008	978-4-7580-6085-1	—	—
Act 019. "I'm Right Here"; Act 020. "Encounter"; Intermission: "Nakakiyono"; Act 021. "When Girlfriend and Boyfriend Change into Swimsuits"; Act 022. "Streets in Shiomi"; Act 023. "Divided Spirit"; Pin-up Collaborator: Yun Kōga (artist of Loveless)
Jin discovers another side of Nagi: Kannagi. Jin manages to talk to her and Kannagi reveals Nagi's true nature at the expense of Jin's warmth, causing Jin to fall ill. Nagi nurses Jin back to health. Later, the Art Club travels to the beach along with Nagi and Tsugumi, and Zange and Reiri arrive as well. The group is surprised with the arrival of Miyuu, a relative of Art Club vice-president Shino Ōkouchi. When Zange tries to reveal Miyuu as a goddess, she is stripped from her body, causing Hakua to regain control. The gods of the beach area detain Nagi, Jin, Hakua, and Reiri, and try to prove Nagi and Zange's identities as demons. However, Nagi and Jin manage to pass the gods' test, proving their divinity.
05	August 9, 2008	978-4-7580-6105-6	—	—
Act 024. "Sea Dragon's Shadow in the Ocean Sunrise"; Intermission: "Interlude MMO"; Act 025. "Hakua's Castle Part 1"; Act 026. "Hakua's Castle Part 2"; Act 027. "In the First Year of High School, We Only Have This Summer Vacation"; Act 028. "The End Of Summer"; Pin-up Collaborator: Ume Aoki (artist of Hidamari Sketch)
The ending of the Beach Arc in which gives more information about who Nagi really is while Hakua's past is shown and how Zange came to possess Hakua's body. Also Akiba wants to draw his own Dojin so the art club helps him out in getting ready to sell it.
06	November 8, 2008	978-4-7580-6117-9	—	—
Act 029. "An ON/OFF Switch for a Calling"; Act 030. "My Truthfully Embarrassing Past"; Act 031. "Dandelion in the Shadows"; Act 032. "High School Idolmaster"; Act 033. "Playing with O-kun"; Act 034. "I Wonder What Love Is"; Pin-up Collaborator: Zekkyō (artist of Toradora! manga)
07	April 27, 2012	978-4-7580-6303-6	—	—
Act 034.5; Act 035. "Wheel of Fate"; Act 036. "Ozuma Appears"; Act 037. "Cut Down, Part 1"; Act 038. "Cut Down, Part 2"; Act 039 "Cut Down, Part 3"; Act 040 "Cut Down, Part 4; Act 041 "Children on the Mountain"; Pin-up Collaborator: Namori (artist of YuruYuri manga)
08	June 27, 2013	978-4-7580-6383-8	—	—
Act 042. "Hinoue Shouhou"; Act 043. "Aquamarine Dress"; Act 044. "Teach Me This Skill!; Act 045. "Jin's Reflections"; Act 046. "The Goddess Kannagi"; Act 047. "The Kannagi Festival"; Pin-up Collaborator: Atsushi Nishigori (of A-1 Pictures)
09	August 2, 2014	978-4-7580-6458-3	—	—
Act 048. "You Are Here"; Act 049. "Dreams"; Act 050. "A Friend"; Act 051. "Memories"; Act 052. "Sharing Sense"; Act 053. "The Holy Place (Part 001)"; Act 054. "The Holy Place (Part 002)"; Pin-up Collaborator: Yui Hara (artist of Kin-iro Mosaic manga)
10	July 27, 2015	978-4-7580-6508-5	—	—
Act 055. "Grafting"; Act 056. "Back to Daily Life"; Act 057. "The Goddess's Jealousy"; Act 058. "Cheer Up!"; Act 059. "Yasuhi and Mitsuyo's Advice"; Act 060. "Akiba's Rebellion"; Act 061. "Christmas of a Hopeless Girl"; Pin-up Collaborator: Gekka Urū (illustrator of Shomin Sample light novel)
11	July 27, 2016	978-4-7580-6606-8	—	—
Act 62. "Night of Open Hearts"; Act 62. "Night of Open Hearts"; Act 63. "A Sunny Day Under Clear Sky"; Act 64. "A Dark Day Under Cloudy Sky"; Act 65. "Missing Magic"; Act 66. "Nouvelle Shino Works"; Act 67. "Nouvelle Shino Works, Afterwards"; Act 68. "Completion"; Pin-up Collaborator
12	July 27, 2017	978-4-7580-6672-3	—	—
Act 69. Rendezvous With a Goddess; Act 70. Song (Part 1); Act 71. Song (Part 2); Act 72. Confession After Confession of the Confession; Act 73. 僕はお姫様抱っこで僕のお姫様を守る; Act 74. 仕舞; Act 75. 桜待つ凪; Pin-up Collaborator

== See also ==
- List of Kannagi: Crazy Shrine Maidens episodes
