= List of Kannagi: Crazy Shrine Maidens episodes =

The cover of the first DVD compilation released by Aniplex on November 26, 2008; the character featured on the cover is Nagi.

The episodes of the 2008 Japanese animated television series Kannagi: Crazy Shrine Maidens are based on the Kannagi manga series written and illustrated by Eri Takenashi. The episodes are directed by Yutaka Yamamoto, and produced by the Japanese animation studio A-1 Pictures, Aniplex, and Ordet. The plot of the episodes follows Jin Mikuriya, a teenager in modern Japan who accidentally summons a goddess by creating a wooden sculpture from his family's ancestral tree. Together with the goddess, who is named Nagi, Jin must destroy the impurities that are gathering in his town because his ancestral tree has been cut down.

The episodes started airing on October 4, 2008, on Tokyo MX in Japan. Other stations that aired the series at later dates include MBS, TVQ, RNB, CTC, TBC, TV Saitama, tvk, Animax, CBC, HBC and BS Japan. The anime adaptation of the manga was confirmed on February 5, 2008, by Ichijinsha, and the official website of the anime began to stream a trailer of the anime on August 15, 2008.

Two pieces of theme music are used for the episodes: one opening theme and one closing theme. The opening theme is "motto Hade ni ne!" (motto☆派手にね!; lit. 'Make it Flashier!'), and the closing theme is "Musuhi no Toki" (産巣日の時; lit. 'When It's a Day to Nest'); both are sung by Nagi's voice actress, Haruka Tomatsu. Three singles containing the theme music and other tracks by Tomatsu were released on October 29, 2008. Four DVD compilations, each containing two episodes of the anime, were released by Aniplex; the compilations were released between November 26, 2008, and February 25, 2009.

An unaired episode was included in Kannagi DVD volume 7, released on May 27, 2009.

== Episode list ==
No.	Title	End Card	Original release date
1	"The Shrine Maiden"; Transliteration: "Himorogi no Musume" (Japanese: 神籬の娘)	Satoshi Kadowaki	October 4, 2008
Jin Mikuriya creates a sculpture of a young woman from the wood of his ancestral tree for an exhibition. When he tries to leave his house, the statue cracks to reveal a young woman. She explains that she is a goddess named Nagi, and when she asks Jin how he created a vessel to materialize her, he reveals he used wood from his family's ancestral tree. Nagi and Jin go to what used to be Jin's family's shrine to find that the tree has been cut down and there are impurities in the area. Both of them return to Jin's house, where Nagi watches a magical girl anime on the television. Inspired, Nagi returns with Jin to the shrine, and while he holds the impurities, she destroys them with an improvised exorcist staff. In the end, Nagi decides to live at Jin's house, which he reluctantly accepts.
2	"Royal Voice Attack!"; Transliteration: "Gyokuon Atakku!" (Japanese: 玉音アタック!)	Takashi Takeuchi	October 11, 2008
Nagi and Jin are surprised by Tsugumi Aoba, a classmate and friend of Jin, paying a visit to him. Nagi sorts things out by fabricating a story about her being Jin's half-sister who started living with him. Later, Nagi and Jin end up in an argument, and Nagi leaves the house. Nagi returns to the sacred tree's place and finds a kid playing there with an impurity in his body. Nagi tries to cleanse it without Jin's help, just to find herself in danger. Jin appears in the nick of time to save her and he ends up carrying an injured Nagi back home.
3	"School Goddess"; Transliteration: "Sukūru no Megami" (Japanese: スクールの女神)	Okama	October 18, 2008
Jin and his clubmates Daitetsu Hibiki and Meguru Akiba receive the task of cleaning an old storehouse from their seniors at the art club. Upon arriving there, Jin finds a spider-like impurity wandering there, but he ends up hiding the fact from Nagi. However, she becomes suspicious about his behavior and borrowed one of Tsugumi's spare uniforms to infiltrate the school. Nagi tagged along Jin and his classmates to figure out the mysterious being knocking from the cellar at the storehouse, just to find out that it was a teacher from the school whose studio lies under the floor. Nagi continues to search for the spider-like impurity, only to find a mysterious girl, who addresses Nagi as her older sister, easily destroying it.
4	"Sisters"; Transliteration: "Shisutāzu" (Japanese: シスターーズ)	Itaru Hinoue	October 25, 2008
What had been the shrine grounds is under development. Nagi witnesses workers uprooting what is left of her sacred tree, and afterwards discusses with Jin that she must find another object of worship to replace the tree, otherwise her powers will continue to wane until she disappears completely. Akiba tells Jin, who was questioning his classmates about idols, about a popular girl named Zange, the mysterious girl who Nagi met at the school. After Jin had an encounter with Zange herself, Nagi learns about her popularity, and after a little investigation, she also suspects that Zange of dark intentions. Her theory is proven true when she finds and confronts Zange herself, accusing her of using a human as a host. Zange admits that a girl named Hakua Suzushiro is acting as her vessel "by free will". Just when Zange manages to put Nagi at her mercy, Jin appears and is shocked with the scene. Late at night Zange appears at Jin's place, stating that as amends for earlier, she will take care of him from then on.
5	"Revelation! Love the Spirits of Dining Table"; Transliteration: "Hatsugen! Shokutaku Majin o Aiseyo" (Japanese: 発現!しょくたくまじんを愛せよ)	Ume Aoki	November 1, 2008
Zange, Nagi, and Tsugumi have a cook-off to try to impress Jin. Later, Jin discovers Nagi has become popular among the students; she even has a website and fan club. However, the teachers became worried about her influence with the students, and Nagi ends up confronted by Suzushiro's father. When the students cheer for her as she faces one of the teachers, Nagi discovers that her godly powers has increased a little. Thanks to Suzushiro, who is revealed to be Hakua(Zange)'s father and an influential patron in the school, the incident is settled when she is officially enrolled at the school.
6	"Nagi's Heartpounding Craziness"; Transliteration: "Nagi-tan no Dokidoki Kureijī" (Japanese: ナギたんのドキドキクレイジー)	Hanaharu Naruko	November 8, 2008
Jin arranges for Tsugumi to help Nagi with shopping. Nagi is happy at first, until she finds out that the money she got from Jin is too low, and she decides to look for a part-time job to help with expenses. She starts working at a maid café where Tsugumi is also working by request of a friend. Both did not expect to meet acquaintances at the café, until they are surprised by Jin and his fellow clubmates from the art club. Jin, unable to stop looking at Nagi as he found her too cute in her maid attire, ends up causing a scene when she approaches him, and Nagi decides to stop working there.
7	"Cutie in a Big Pinch! Revenge of the Super Spicy Hitsumabushi (Part 2)"; Transliteration: "Kyūtī Daipinchi! Gekikara Hitsumabushi no Gyakushū (Kōhen)" (Japanese: キューティー大ピンチ!激辛ひつまぶしの逆襲(後篇))	—	November 15, 2008
Nagi gets angry at Jin and shuts herself into his closet. Despite Jin and his friends' efforts, Nagi refuses to set foot out of it. Later it was explained that Nagi's reason for her anger is that Jin accidentally erased a taped episode of Nagi's favorite anime show before she watched it. After Jin gives up trying to get her out the closet by force, he finds that Nagi had already left by herself, much to his own anger.
8	"Straying Wuthering Heights"; Transliteration: "Meisō Arashi ga Oka" (Japanese: 迷走嵐が丘)	Zekkyō	November 22, 2008
Jin's clubmate Daitetsu is sheltered in his home during a stormy night. While pondering about Jin and Nagi's behavior, he starts wondering about their feelings for each other, and later, if they are really siblings at all. During dinner, Daitetsu confesses that he stole the cut down ancient tree Jin used to bring Nagi to life. Nagi got angry at him, and stated that he would be cursed by the gods. Full of remorse, and really in fear of some divine punishment, Daitetsu runs for the place where the tree was and asks forgiveness to the gods, and Nagi uses her powers to protect him from a bolt of lightning, collapsing soon later, much to Jin's worries, as he had seen her in this state before.
9	"Embarrassing School Comedy"; Transliteration: "Hazukashii Gakuen Komedi" (Japanese: 恥ずかしい学園コメディ)	Toru Minazuki	November 29, 2008
After witnessing a heated discussion between Nagi and Daitetsu about Jin, Tsugumi and the other members of the Art Club started questioning themselves about the true nature of Jin and Daitetsu's relationship. Later, Tsugumi accidentally makes the discussion get public, and rumors about the duo being a homosexual couple started to spread, much to their own troubles. A friend of Tsugumi encourages her to bring the topic to Zange, who decided that the best solution to the problem is for Jin to officially date a girl, and she offers herself to do so. Later at Jin's house, Tsugumi apologizes to him and he is asked by them to choose between dating Zange or her to clear out all misunderstandings, until Nagi suggests that both should be trying to get his affection in public as a "fitting solution". However, having two girls fighting so fervently for Jin at school ends up fueling even more bad rumors about him.
10	"Karaoke Warrior Mike Takako"; Transliteration: "Karaoke Senshi Maiku Takako" (Japanese: カラオケ戦士マイク貴子)	Takahiro Kimura, Ōkouchi Ricca	December 6, 2008
The group is reunited to have a karaoke party, supposedly to help them bond. However, Tsugumi, Jin, and Zange's relationship complications quickly make the session extremely awkward. At the end, when they are leaving from the karaoke box, Jin realizes and points out that only Shino did not sing during the party. However, Takako explains that Shino would have to open her eyes in order to sing. But Shino decides to let everyone see her eyes before the episode ends.
11	"But, Uncertain"; Transliteration: "Demo, Ayafuya" (Japanese: でも、あやふや)	Shinichi Yūki	December 13, 2008
After being fed up with the unwanted attentions at school, which were primarily caused by Nagi's faults, Jin demands her an apology. In addition, he wants her to clarify several uncertain things around him such as her purpose of staying in Jin's home and the occurrence of impurities in the village. Frustrated with not being able to answer Jin's questions, she runs away from him and disappears. Jin consults with Suzushiro about Nagi and Suzushiro thinks that Nagi may be uncertain about her own identity, especially whether she is really a god. Jin heads to the school library to do a research on the Kannagi village's god, but finds out that its identity is still officially unknown.
12	"It's Really Ephemeral"; Transliteration: "Hontō ni Efemeraru" (Japanese: ほんとうにエフェメラル)	Kiyohiko Azuma	December 20, 2008
Daitetsu finds that Nagi left her staff behind and gives it to Jin. After Jin arrives at home, he finds that Nagi is nowhere to be found and discovers a written message from her claiming that she lied to him all along and asking his forgiveness. He keeps looking for her without success and when Tsugumi inquires him about the reason for Nagi not coming to the school anymore, he replies saying that maybe they will never see her again.
13	"Jin, Lovestruck"; Transliteration: "Jin, Dereru" (Japanese: 仁、デレる)	TBA	December 27, 2008
Jin is frustrated by his efforts to find Nagi although in vain. Tsugumi tries to find out what's wrong with Nagi's absence from school. Finally, Tsugumi persuades Jin to find Nagi again with the help of the school's blog. Although Jin finds Nagi but she is still unsure whether she is really a god, however Jin tells her not to worry and promises to assist her. In the end, Nagi follows Jin home only to find out that she herself begins to have feelings for him.
14	"What If "Kannagi" Was Like This..."; Transliteration: "Moshimo Konna 'Kannagi' ga Attara..." (Japanese: もしもこんな「かんなぎ」があったら...)	Eri Takenashi	May 27, 2009 (DVD Only)
Takako and Shino find 1,000,000 yen on the street, and use the 100,000 yen reward by assembling Nagi, Zange, Tsugumi and the rest of the art club to make an independent movie with it. However, during the shooting session, the group is taken by a storm and takes shelter at the school. To complicate matters, one of the movies that Akiba rented as research material is almost past devolution time, and he decides to face the storm along Daitetsu, Jin and Nagi to bring it back to the shop in time, but only Jin and Nagi manage to reach the shop just to find that they have no money to pay for the rental. In the end, Takako again found a great deal of yen on the street.
