= 2013 in manga =

The following is an overview of 2013 in manga. It includes winners of notable awards, best-sellers, title debuts and endings, deaths of notable manga-related people as well as any other relevant manga-related events. For an overview of the year in comics from other countries, see 2013 in comics.

== Awards ==
- 37th Kodansha Manga Awards
  - Best Children's Manga: Animal Land by Makoto Raiku
  - Best Shōnen Manga: Your Lie in April by Naoshi Arakawa
  - Best Shōjo Manga: Ore Monogatari!!, written by Kazune Kawahara and illustrated by Aruko
  - Best General Manga: Gurazeni, written by Yūji Moritaka and illustrated by Keiji Adachi and Prison School by Akira Hiramoto
- 6th Manga Taishō: Umimachi Diary by Akimi Yoshida
- 44th Seiun Awards
  - Best Comic: Inherit the Stars by Yukinobu Hoshino
- 58th Shogakukan Manga Awards
  - Best Children's Manga: Mysterious Joker by Hideyasu Takahashi
  - Best Shōnen Manga: Silver Spoon by Hiromu Arakawa
  - Best Shōjo Manga: Piece – Kanojo no Kioku by Hinako Ashihara
  - Best General Manga: I Am a Hero by Kengo Hanazawa
- 17th Tezuka Osamu Cultural Prize
  - Grand Prize: Kingdom by Yasuhisa Hara
  - New Creator Prize: Sunny Sunny Ann! by Miki Yamamoto
  - Short Work Prize: Kikai-jikake no Ai by Yoshiie Gōda

== Best-sellers ==
=== Titles ===
The following is a list of the 10 best-selling manga titles in Japan during 2014 according to Oricon.

Rank	Title	Copies
1	One Piece	18,151,599
2	Attack on Titan	15,933,801
3	Kuroko's Basketball	8,761,081
4	Magi: The Labyrinth of Magic	7,151,001
5	Naruto	5,553,933
6	Silver Spoon	4,858,699
7	Assassination Classroom	4,595,820
8	Hunter × Hunter	4,231,475
9	Fairy Tail	3,790,151
10	Terra Formars	3,602,630

=== Volumes ===
The following is a list of the 10 best-selling manga volumes in Japan during 2014 according to Oricon.

Rank	Volume	Copies
1	One Piece vol.69	3,147,224
2	One Piece vol.70	3,039,487
3	One Piece vol.71	2,890,263
4	One Piece vol.72	2,354,005
5	Attack on Titan vol.9	1,950,807
6	Attack on Titan vol.10	1,915,976
7	Attack on Titan vol.11	1,453,879
8	Attack on Titan vol.8	1,339,845
9	Attack on Titan vol.1	1,299,048
10	Attack on Titan vol.1	1,267,129

== Title debuts ==
- January - Aikatsu!, written by Shiori Kanaki and illustrated by Akane
- January - Aoharu x Machinegun by NAOE
- January - The Asterisk War, written by Yuu Miyazaki and illustrated by Ningen
- February 12 - Toaru Majutsu no Index: Endymion no Kiseki, written by Kazuma Kamachi and illustrated by Ryōsuke Asakura
- February 15 - Kōdai-ke no Hitobito by Kozueko Morimoto
- April 27 - Absolute Duo, written by Takumi Hiiragiboshi and illustrated by Shin'ichirō Nariie
- April - Dame na Watashi ni Koishite Kudasai by Aya Nakahara
- April - Seisen Cerberus: Mō Hitori no Eiyū, written and illustrated by Seijirō Narumi
- May - Complex Age by Yui Sakuma
- May - Bamboo Blade C, written by Masahiro Totsuka and illustrated by Jingu Takao
- June 13 - A-bout!! - Asagiri Daikatsuyaku Hen by Ichikawa Masa
- August 26 - Attack on Titan: Before the Fall, written by Ryō Suzukaze and illustrated by Satoshi Shiki
- August 30 - Ashizuri Suizokukan by Panpanya
- August - The Comic Artist and His Assistants 2 by Hiroyuki
- September 28 - No Regrets, written by Gun Snark and illustrated by Hikaru Suruga
- September - Mini Vanguard by Quily
- October 12 - Handa-kun by Satsuki Yoshino
- October 25 - Akame ga Kill! Zero, written by Takahiro and illustrated by Kei Toru
- October - BB Deformer, written by Masahiro Totsuka and illustrated by Saki Azumi
- October - Battle Spirits: Saikyou Ginga Ultimate Zero, written by Hajime Yatate and illustrated by Masato Ichishiki
- October - Salaryman Exorcist: The Sorrows of Yukio Okumura, written by Kazue Kato and illustrated by Minoru Sasaki
- November 6 - Bartender à Tokyo, written by Araki Joh and illustrated by Osamu Kajisa
- November 9 - 12 Beast by Okayado
- November 9 - Bayonetta: Bloody Fate by Mizuki Sakakibara
- December 27 - Abyss of Hyperspace, written by Tatsuo Sato and illustrated by Chibimaru
- December 27 - A Certain Scientific Accelerator, written by Kazuma Kamachi and illustrated by Arata Yamaji
- December - 37.5°C no Namida by Chika Shiina
- December - Angel Beats! The 4-koma: Osora no Shinda Sekai kara, written by Jun Maeda and illustrated by Haruka Komowata
- December - Sungeki no Kyojin by hounori
- December - Captain Tsubasa: Rising Sun by Yōichi Takahashi
- The Ancient Magus' Bride by Kore Yamazaki
- Clockwork Planet, written by Yuu Kamiya and Tsubaki Himana and illustrated by Kuro

== Title endings ==
- April - Seisen Cerberus: Mō Hitori no Eiyū, written and illustrated by Seijirō Narumi
- May - A-bout! by Ichikawa Masa
- October 12 - Toaru Majutsu no Index: Endymion no Kiseki, written by Kazuma Kamachi and illustrated by Ryōsuke Asakura
- December 9 - Bayonetta: Bloody Fate by Mizuki Sakakibara
- December 13 - Oboreru Knife by George Asakura
- Bartender à Paris, written by Araki Joh and illustrated by Osamu Kajisa

== Deaths ==
- February 6 - Yūji Nishi, manga artist
- April 4 - Noboru Yamaguchi, light novel author
- August - Jun Sadogawa, manga artist
- October 13 - Takashi Yanase, manga artist
- October 22 - Yanwari Kazama, manga artist
- November 3 - Ichirō Tsunohazu, manga artist
- Isuka Hakozaki, manga artist

== See also ==
- 2013 in anime
