= Brasserie Lancelot =

Brewery in Roc-Saint-André, Morbihan, France

The brasserie Lancelot (French: [bʁasʁi lɑ̃slo]) is a French brewery founded in 1990 by Bernard Lancelot, located on the site of a gold mine in Roc-Saint-André in Morbihan. It produces seven top-fermented, unfiltered, naturally-produced and unpasteurised beers, named after figures from the history and literature of Brittany. It is one of the main brewery in the west part of France with a production of 30 000 hectoliters per year. It is the number one local beer in Brittany on-trade and number two off trade.

== Beers ==
=== La Duchesse Anne ===
This beer is named after Anne of Brittany.

=== Les Bonnets Rouges ===
This beer is named after the revolt of the bonnets rouges.

=== Telenn Du ===
This beer is brewed from barley and buckwheat. Pioneer of buckwheat beers, its name means "black harp" in Breton. It sported a picture of a black harp at its beginnings, but after protests from Guinness, it was replaced by a white triskelion.

=== XI.I ===
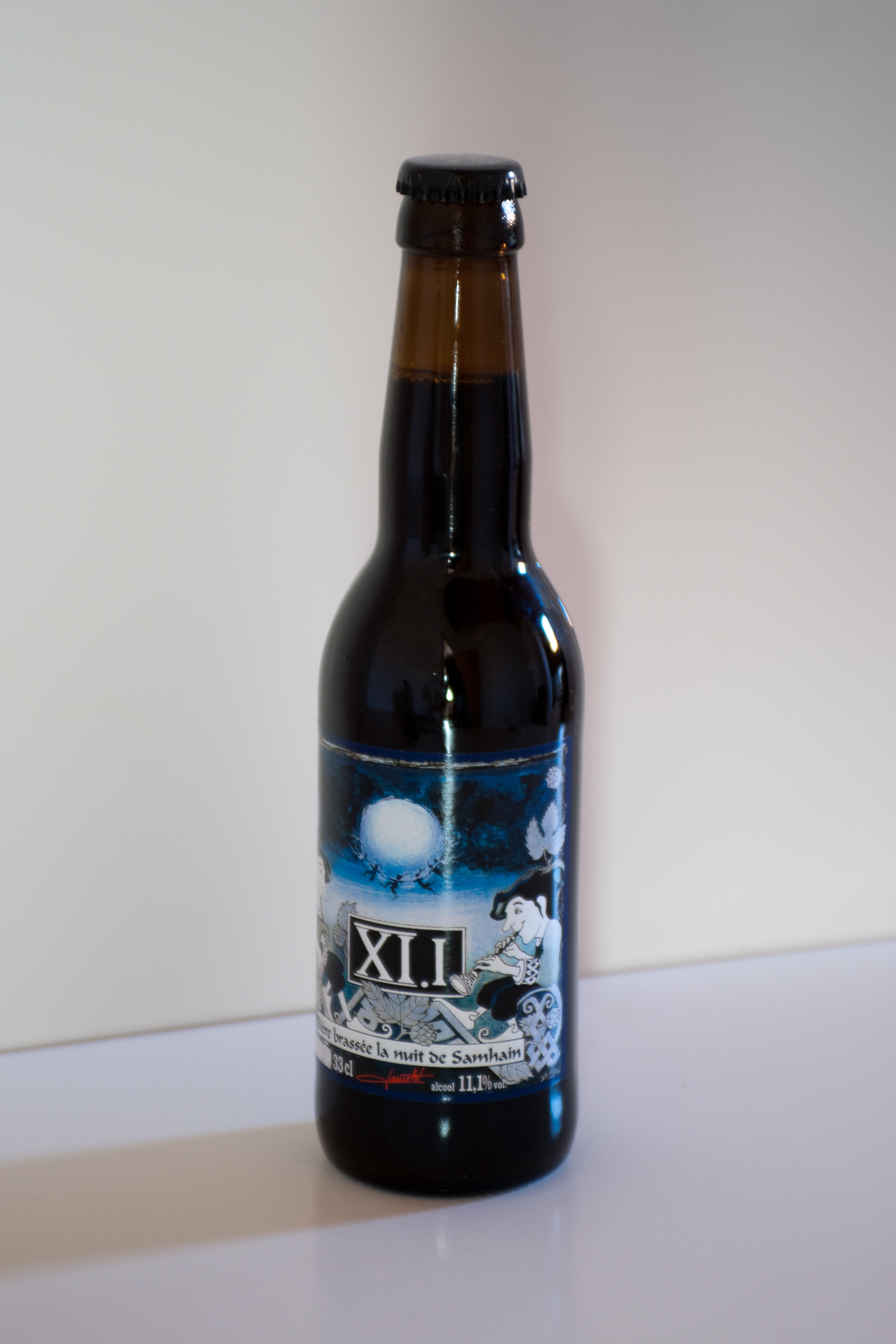
A bottle of XI.I

This beer is named after Samhain (eleventh month of the year, first day). It's a dark barley wine, very alcoholic for a beer (11.1 ABV) and with a very strong flavour.

== Other products ==
Lancelot also sells the Breizh Cola, the chouchen Lancelot, and in 2006 began production of the organic Morgane beer, marketed as "100% Breton and 100% organic".
