= La Chapelle-Caro =

La Chapelle-Caro Chapel-Karozh
- Part of Val d'Oust
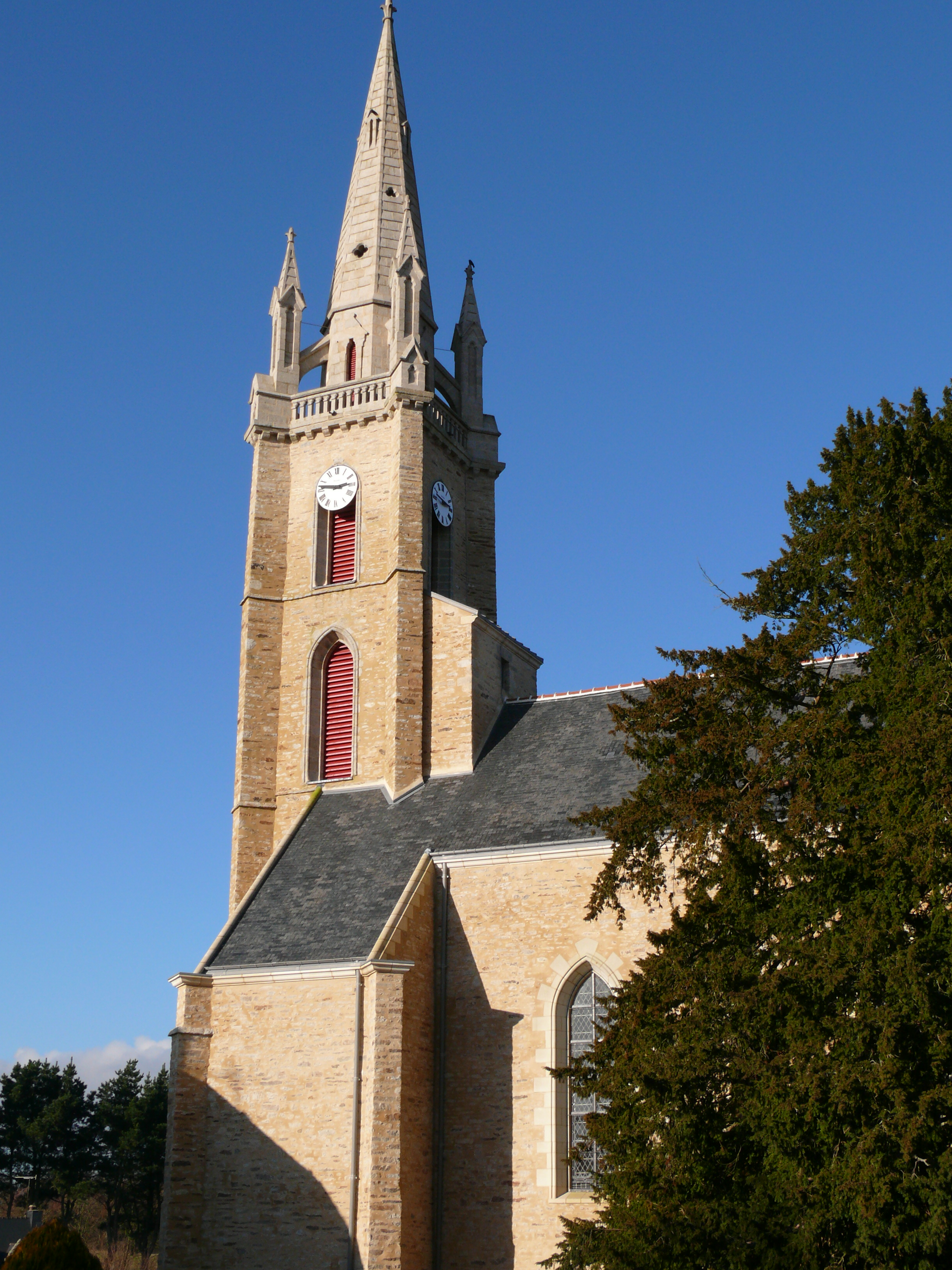
- The church in La Chapelle-Caro

- Coat of arms
- Location of La Chapelle-Caro
- Location within France Location within Brittany
- Coordinates: 47°51′57″N 2°25′19″W
- Country: France
- Region: Brittany
- Department: Morbihan
- Arrondissement: Pontivy
- Canton: Moréac
- Commune: Val d'Oust
- Area^{1}: 16.49 km^{2} (6.37 sq mi)
- Highest elevation: 117 m (384 ft)
- Lowest elevation: 15 m (49 ft)
- Population (2022): 1,468
  - Density: 89.02/km^{2} (230.6/sq mi)
- Time zone: UTC+01:00 (CET)
  - Summer (DST): UTC+02:00 (CEST)
- Postal code: 56460
- ^{1} French Land Register data, which excludes lakes, ponds, glaciers > 1 km^{2} (0.386 sq mi or 247 acres) and river estuaries.

La Chapelle-Caro (French pronunciation: [la ʃapɛl kaʁo]; Breton: Chapel-Karozh) is a former commune in the Morbihan department of Brittany in north-western France. On 1 January 2016, it was merged into the new commune Val d'Oust. Its population was 1,468 in 2022. Inhabitants of La Chapelle-Caro are called in French Chapellois.

== See also ==
- Communes of the Morbihan department
