= Val d'Oust =

- Commune
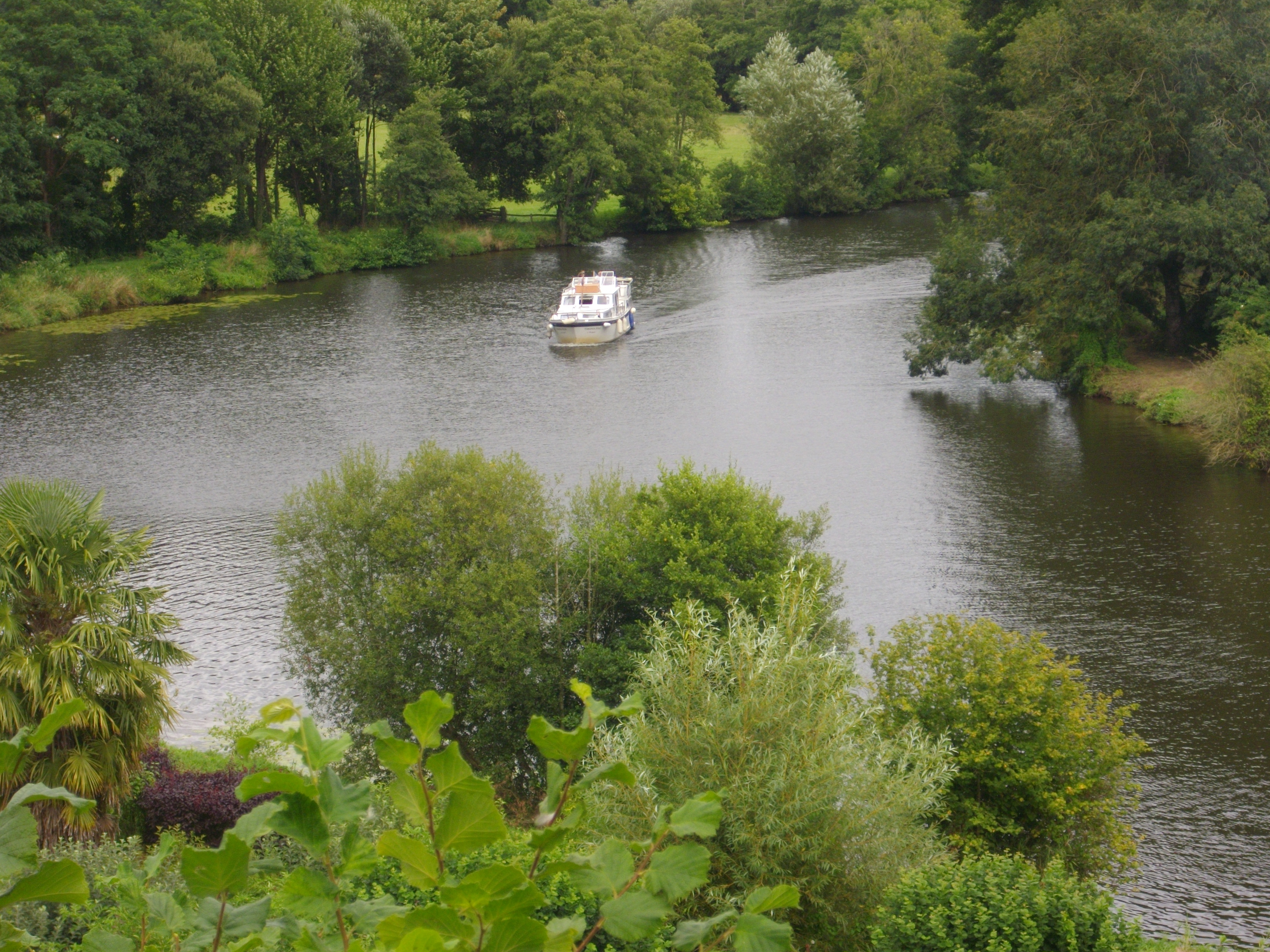
- The Nantes-Brest Canal
- Location of Val d'Oust
- Location within France Location within Brittany
- Coordinates: 47°51′54″N 2°26′56″W
- Country: France
- Region: Brittany
- Department: Morbihan
- Arrondissement: Pontivy
- Canton: Moréac

Government
  - Mayor (2026–32): Florence Prunet
- Area^{1}: 31.81 km^{2} (12.28 sq mi)
- Population (2023): 2,807
  - Density: 88.24/km^{2} (228.5/sq mi)
- Time zone: UTC+01:00 (CET)
  - Summer (DST): UTC+02:00 (CEST)
- INSEE/Postal code: 56197 /56460
- ^{1} French Land Register data, which excludes lakes, ponds, glaciers > 1 km^{2} (0.386 sq mi or 247 acres) and river estuaries.

Val d'Oust (French pronunciation: [val dust], literally Vale of Oust; Breton: Traoñ-an-Oud) is a commune in the Morbihan department of western France, named after the river Oust. Le Roc-Saint-André is the municipal seat. The municipality was established on 1 January 2016 and consists of the former communes of Le Roc-Saint-André, Quily and La Chapelle-Caro.

== Population ==
Population data refer to the area corresponding with the commune as of January 2025.

Historical population
Year	Pop.	±% p.a.
1968	1,897	—
1975	1,909	+0.09%
1982	2,137	+1.62%
1990	2,248	+0.63%
1999	2,300	+0.25%
2007	2,530	+1.20%
2012	2,612	+0.64%
2017	2,705	+0.70%
2023	2,807	+0.62%
Source: INSEE

== See also ==
- Communes of the Morbihan department
