= Fractale =

Television anime directed by Yutaka Yamamoto

- Cover of the first volume of the Fractale manga series

フラクタル (Furakutaru)
- Genre: Science fiction
- Created by: Mandelbrot Engine
- Manga
- Written by: Hiroki Azuma; Mari Okada; Yutaka Yamamoto
- Illustrated by: Mutsumi Akasaki
- Published by: Square Enix
- Magazine: Gangan Online
- Original run: September 30, 2010 – November 17, 2011
- Volumes: 3
- Anime television series
- Directed by: Yutaka Yamamoto
- Produced by: Tomonori Ochikoshi; Atsuhito Isoda
- Written by: Mari Okada
- Music by: Sōhei Kano
- Studio: A-1 Pictures; Ordet (production cooperation)
- Licensed by: AUS: Siren Visual; NA: Crunchyroll; UK: Manga Entertainment
- Original network: Fuji TV (Noitamina)
- Original run: January 13, 2011 – March 31, 2011
- Episodes: 11
- Serial novel

Fractale/Reloaded
- Written by: Hiroki Azuma
- Published by: Media Factory
- Magazine: Da Vinci
- Original run: February 2011 – May 2011

Fractale (フラクタル, Furakutaru) is an 11-episode Japanese anime television series created by Mandelbrot Engine, an artist collective consisting of critic and novelist Hiroki Azuma, screenwriter Mari Okada, and director Yutaka Yamamoto. The anime aired in Japan between January and March 2011 on Fuji TV's Noitamina programming block. A manga illustrated by Mutsumi Akasaki was serialized in Square Enix's Gangan Online between September 2010 and November 2011.

== Plot ==
The story takes place on an island resembling a 22nd-century Ireland (certain scenes are taken directly from Galway, a city in the west of Ireland), in a world ruled by "Fractale", a satellite-based virtual reality and content delivery system which ensures mankind's stability and prosperity. One day, Clain meets a fleeing girl called Phryne, who disappears during the night leaving a pendant. When he is able to activate the pendant (which turns into a "doppel" named Nessa), Clain sets out on a journey with the girl-shaped avatar Nessa to look for Phryne and discovers the secret behind the Fractale System.

== Characters ==
=== Main characters ===
Clain Necran (クレイン・ネクラン, Kurein Nekuran)
Voiced by: Yū Kobayashi (Japanese); Brina Palencia (English)
Clain is the main character. At the beginning of the series, he lives alone with "doppels"—holographic robots-which are representations of his parents. Although they act exactly as his real parents would, Clain is able to disperse them at will when he is tired of their talk. In terms of interests, Clain holds a strong curiosity in items created before the Fractale system was established such as an antique digital camera or a 21st century cell phone. Throughout the series, he is shown to be emotionally simple; all he really wants is to live happily together with his friends Phryne and Nessa.
Phryne (フリュネ, Furyune)
Voiced by: Minami Tsuda (Japanese); Caitlin Glass (English)
Phryne is a priestess of the Fractale system and later revealed to be the incomplete key to resetting Fractale. She is very closed about her background, partially due to sexual abuse. Often, she makes Clain blush due to her little sense of embarrassment and lack of decency. At the beginning of the series, Phryne runs away to try to stop the Fractale cycle. She is reluctant to make friends because she believes it is necessary for her to sacrifice herself for the good of all.
Nessa (ネッサ, Nessa)
Voiced by: Kana Hanazawa (Japanese); Luci Christian (English)
Nessa is a "doppel" copy of Phryne's younger self, composed of "data" important to the Fractale system. Her existence is unique because, unlike other doppels, she can be touched, but only by people she chooses. Her character is very cheerful, energetic, and carefree. Clain meets Nessa for the first time when she suddenly appears out of Phryne's brooch. She smiles a lot and likes to explore, even occasionally dragging Clain into trouble. Her motto is often quoted to be that she "loves love." Like Clain, she expresses that she simply wants to be together with her friends.

=== Supporting characters ===
Sunda Granitz (スンダ・グラニッツ, Sunda Guranittsu)
Voiced by: Shintaro Asanuma (Japanese); Scott Freeman (English)
The leader of the Granitz faction of Lost Millennium that Clain first encounters with. He is harsh and rude to Clain at first, but gradually, he lightens up. During the final confrontation, Sunda helps Clain enter the Temple and search for Phryne. While in the Temple, Sunda sacrifices himself to allow Clain to join Phryne and Nessa while they journey to reach the Temple's inner sanctum.
Enri Granitz (エンリ・グラニッツ, Enri Guranittsu)
Voiced by: Yuka Iguchi (Japanese); Monica Rial (English)
Enri is Sunda's little sister. Although clumsy in many ways, she supports her brother in every way she can, and often helps command Lost Millennium troops. Enri is often accompanied by two sidekicks, Takamy (タカミー, Takamī) and Butcher (ブッチャー, Bucchā), the latter being killed during a confrontation with Temple forces. At the conclusion of the series, Enri becomes the leader of the Granitz faction and helps teach those who were once dependent on Fractale to live independent lives.
Dias
Voiced by: Tomoaki Maeno (Japanese); Eric Vale (English)
Dias is the leader of the Alabaster faction of Lost Millennium. While Dias seems friendly at first, he is actually extremely manipulative and cold hearted, such as tricking a group of Fractale refugees into removing their terminals and forcing them to join his faction, gunning down one refugee when he attempts to flee. Dias joins with Sunda to rescue Phryne and Clain from the Temple, but exploits the opportunity to destroy the facility instead. During the final confrontation between Lost Millennium and the Temple, Dias's troops sacrifice themselves to destroy the Temple. When Archpriestess Moeran offers Sunda, Clain, and himself safety so that they may witness the restart of Fractale, he uses the opportunity to get close to Moeran, killing both in a suicidal explosion.

=== Antagonists ===
Moeran
Voiced by: Sumi Shimamoto (Japanese); Stephanie Young (English)
Moeran is the Archpriestess of the Temple and a Phryne clone. Although she is the head of the temple, Moeran has a great hatred for Phryne because the younger clone is "beloved", giving Phryne a greater importance than Moeran. When Phryne confronts Moeran in order to stop the violence between the Temple and Lost Millennium, Moeran attempts to strangle the younger clone out of jealousy. In the conclusion of the series, she offers Sunda, Clain, and Dias safety while they witness the restart of Fractale. However, Dias uses the opportunity to get close to Moeran, killing both in an explosion.
Barrot
Voiced by: Mitsuru Miyamoto (Japanese); Bucky Pearl (English)
Barrot is a priest in charge of raising Phryne to become the "key" to restarting Fractale. Barrot is often overly affectionate towards Phryne, frequently groping her body when he is together with her and even insists on witnessing her gynecological exam to check that she has not been "spoiled". At the end of the series, Barrot reveals the full truth about Phryne and Nessa to Clain and that he had been using some of the clones for his own sexual pleasure. However, while proclaiming that Phryne is his alone, she stabs him with a knife and runs off.

== Media ==
=== Manga ===
A manga adaptation illustrated by Mutsumi Akasaki was serialized in Square Enix's Gangan Online magazine between September 30, 2010 and November 17, 2011. Three tankōbon volumes were published.

No.	Release date	ISBN
1	January 22, 2011	978-4-7575-3124-6
2	July 22, 2011	978-4-7575-3288-5
3	January 21, 2012	978-4-7575-3479-7

=== Anime ===
The 11-episode Fractale anime television series produced by A-1 Pictures in cooperation with Ordet, aired in Japan between January 13 and March 31, 2011, on Fuji TV's Noitamina programming block. The anime aired on Kansai TV and Tokai TV at later dates. The anime is directed by Yutaka Yamamoto, the story was developed by Hiroki Azuma, and the screenplay was written by Mari Okada. Chief animator Masako Tashiro based the character design used in the anime on the illustrator Hidari's original concept. The music was produced by Sōhei Shikano and the sound director is Yōta Tsuruoka. The anime's opening theme song is "Harinezumi" (ハリネズミ; "Hedgehog"), and the ending themes are English and Japanese versions of "Down by the Salley Gardens" (サリーガーデン, Sarī Gāden) that was written in 1889 by William Butler Yeats; both songs are sung by Hitomi Azuma. The single containing the opening theme and the English version of the ending theme was released on March 9, 2011, by Epic/Sony Records. The series was released on four DVD and Blu-ray compilation volumes between April 22 and July 22, 2011. North American anime distributor Funimation Entertainment streamed the series one hour after the premiere on their video portal and other sites after a brief interruption by the Fractale Production Committee that lasted until Funimation started taking legal action against illegally released episodes of the anime. Funimation released the series in 2012 on DVD and Blu-ray.

==== Episode list ====
No.	Title	Directed by	Written by	Original release date
1	"Encounter"; Transliteration: "Deai" (Japanese: 出会い)	Yutaka Yamamoto	Mari Okada	January 13, 2011
While taking a walk, Clain has an encounter with the mysterious Phryne who was running away from a gang of pursuers. Clain and Phryne soon become friends, but in the following day she disappears without saying a word, leaving a mysterious item behind.
2	"Nessa"; Transliteration: "Nessa" (Japanese: ネッサ)	Mamoru Kanbe	Mari Okada	January 20, 2011
While examining the brooch left by Phryne, Clain finds that Nessa, a doppel in human form, was sealed inside it. After trying to dispose of her, he ends up accepting Nessa's company, just before being captured by the same trio that was pursuing Phryne.
3	"Granitz Village"; Transliteration: "Guranittsu no Mura" (Japanese: グラニッツの村)	Yūki Itō	Mari Okada	January 27, 2011
Clain and Nessa are taken to a village that is the headquarters of "Lost Millennium", an organization that is rebelling against the Fractale System. Soon after, Clain is caught up in a vicious confrontation between the rebels and the priestesses, where he meets Phryne again.
4	"Departure"; Transliteration: "Shuppatsu" (Japanese: 出発)	Shingo Adachi	Mari Okada	February 3, 2011
The members of Lost Millennium kidnap Phryne and the temple puts a price on their heads. Clain decides to not get himself involved in the conflict, and just when he is about to run away with Nessa, the village is attacked by the temple's forces.
5	"Journey"; Transliteration: "Tabiji" (Japanese: 旅路)	Shinobu Yoshioka	Shinsuke Ōnishi	February 17, 2011
After escaping the Temple's forces, Clain is forced to earn his keep aboard the airship by doing odd jobs. He notices Sanko with her visor on while playing with someone, whom she claims is Nessa. But when Clain checks, Nessa is nowhere to be found. Later, Clain encounters Phryne and tells her that he believes that Nessa is still around, but she will not appear. Phryne answers that it is because Nessa is jealous as she has become attached to Clain. Soon, the airship begins to experience problems and flies into a thunderstorm, which Clain believes is Nessa's doing. The crew begins looking for Nessa, which turns into a game of hide-and-seek. Thinking that Nessa will not come out while she is around, Phryne attempts to escape the airship. Though Clain tries to talk Phryne out of it, it is Nessa who "finds" Phryne and convinces Phryne to stay.
6	"The Farthest Town"; Transliteration: "Saihate no Machi" (Japanese: 最果ての町)	Yō Miura	Mari Okada	February 24, 2011
While the airship undergoes repairs, Clain and Phryne encounter refugees who found themselves outside the range of Fractale's signal. During an argument between a refugee and man who had taken pictures while Phryne was skinny-dipping, a man named Dias appears and invites the refugees to a nearby town. The photographer runs off and Clain follows him and learns that the man is an antique collector. The collector invites Clain to return that night, which Clain does with Phryne in tow. Along the way, they see Dias's group feeding and vaccinating the refugees. The two arrive at the collector's home and the collector temporarily boosts Fractale's signal to show what the town looked like before the signal was lost. However, the refugees learn that the "vaccinations" were actually removing the terminals from their bodies. When a refugee attempts to flee, Dias has him killed. Afterward, the collector gives Clain the camera.
7	"City of Pride" / "Veneer Town" (Note: The literal translation of "Kyoshoku no Machi" (虚飾の街) is "City of Pride" or "Pride City", however Funimation translated the title as "Veneer Town".); Transliteration: "Kyoshoku no Machi" (Japanese: 虚飾の街)	Ryōtarō Makihara	Hiroyuki Yoshino	March 3, 2011
While searching for fresh water, Clain's and Nessa's mini-airship crashes and Nessa becomes "ill". Clain find himself in the care of Megan, a resident of Xanadu which she claims is perfect. Megan gives Clain a tour of the city and helps Clain locate Nessa, who is in the care of Colin. Colin states that Nessa's illness is the result of someone hacking her code. Clain later discovers that Colin and Megan are not as friendly as they appear. Meanwhile, the airship crew stumbles upon a naturalist village, while searching for Clain and Nessa, but discover that the villagers are the true residents of Xanadu. While Clain escapes with Nessa, Megan appears and attacks Clain with a virus. Nessa becomes upset and releases an energy field that destroys the virtual city. However, one of Colin's guardians is not affected and shoots Clain as the airship's crew and the Temple's forces arrive.
8	"Secret of the Underground"; Transliteration: "Chika no Himitsu" (Japanese: 地下の秘密)	Mamoru Kanbe	Shinsuke Ōnishi	March 10, 2011
With Clain and Phryne in custody, the Temple airship arrives at an underground base and Barrot demands that he check Phryne's virginity. Meanwhile, Sunda enlists the aid of Dias for a rescue mission. Clain wakes up to find a girl who resembles Nessa and claims to be Phryne, who then takes him to a room that contains other clones like her. While Phryne is about to have her exam, Nessa interrupts in a rage before storming off looking for Clain. Phryne follows Nessa and the two meets up with Clain. The three discover a room where the clones are being destroyed. Seeing the clone that helped him earlier, Clain attempts to save her before the Temple forces arrive. Sunda and Dias begin their attack on the base and, with the help of Nessa, break through the defenses. However, Dias charges in and destroys the base, but not before Clain and Phryne find shelter with help from the clone.
9	"No Way Out"; Transliteration: "Oitsumerarete" (Japanese: 追いつめられて)	Yūki Itō	Hiroyuki Yoshino	March 17, 2011
After the destruction of the Temple base and the continued deterioration of Fractale, the Temple begins attacking the home villages of the Lost Millennium factions. While the faction leaders meet to discuss what to do, Dias informs them that Sunda possess the "key" to restarting Fractale. Viewing the Temple as backed into a corner, the factions agree to Dias's plan to join forces to attack the Temple and destroy Fractale. Meanwhile, Phryne tells Clain the truth about Nessa and herself, and how they must eventually become one in order to restart Fractale. Although Clain wants to join Sunda in the attack on the Temple, Sunda instructs Clain to stay behind to protect both Nessa and Phryne. However, the night before the attack, Phryne sneaks out and returns to the Temple to put a stop to everything. When Clain and Nessa discover Phryne missing, they set out after her.
10	"To the Monastery"; Transliteration: "Sōin e" (Japanese: 僧院へ)	Tomohiko Itō	Mari Okada	March 24, 2011
Clain and Nessa catches up with Sunda and tell him that Phryne had returned to the Temple. While Phryne confronts Archpriestess Moeran, Sunda and Clain take a mini-airship and enter the Temple. But Moeran, who is also a clone, hates Phryne because of the younger's greater importance and attempts to strangle Phryne. Meanwhile, Nessa, who remained on the Danan, begins to lose form. After receiving a message from Dias, Enri decides to enter the Temple with Nessa so that they can join Clain and Phryne. Phryne escapes from Moeran during the commotion while Clain, Sunda, Enri, Nessa, and Dias meet up. Although Dias encourages Clain and Nessa to search for Phryne, his real goal is to kill Phryne. Phryne encounters Dias's soldiers, barely escaping before finding Clain and Nessa on the other side of a transparent wall. However, Barrot appears on Phryne's side and claims that he and Phryne are bound together.
11	"Paradise"; Transliteration: "Rakuen" (Japanese: 楽園)	Yutaka Yamamoto	Mari Okada	March 31, 2011
Barrot reveals the whole truth about Phryne and Nessa and the original god of Fractale to Clain. But while Barrot claims that Phryne is his alone, Phryne stabs him and runs away with Nessa following behind. Clain rejoins Sunda and Enri while Phryne decides to merge with Nessa in order to keep Nessa from disappearing. Sunda sends Enri back to the airship before Dias's troops destroy the Temple while he and Clain continue on. Sunda and Clain reach the top of the Temple where they find Archpriestess Moeran with Phryne and Nessa. Moeran grants them and Dias, who arrives safely moments later, while they witness the restart of Fractale. Dias uses the opportunity to blow up Moeran and himself. Sunda and Clain race to Phryne and Nessa, but Sunda pushes Clain into the elevator while holding off the Temple's troops. After Clain confesses his feelings to Phryne, the three arrive at the Sanctum and discover that the original Phryne was a 16-year-old girl who retained the personality of a 10-year-old child due to a mental traumatization, and whose "data" was collected to create the Fractale system. Afterward, Phryne and Nessa join together and Fractale is restarted. One year later, the people are learning to live without being dependent on Fractale. Clain has returned home and is taking care of an unconscious Phryne. Phryne finally awakes, but surprises Clain by behaving like Nessa. After a moment, she reveals to him that she has always loved him too, and that she is happy now, Clain, realizing that it really is the women he loves, tearfully embraces her with Phryne happily accepting it. The series ends with a close up of the family photo that was taken before the attack on the temple, with Clain, Phryne and an invisible Nessa along with the rest of Sunda's faction of lost millennium.

=== Novel ===
A serial novel written by Hiroki Azuma based on Fractale titled Fractale/Reloaded (フラクタル/リローデッド) was serialized between the February and May 2011 issues of Media Factory's Da Vinci magazine. The novel features a different story in the Fractale universe than the manga and anime, which follow the same story.

== Reception ==
The Encyclopedia of Science Fiction described Fractale as a good but flawed anime, praising its interesting themes and imaginative worldbuilding while finding its plot merely functional and occasionally slow-paced. It highlighted the series' exploration of virtual reality, personal identity and the relationship between technological dependence and social control, alongside its satire of religion and politics, which it considered insufficiently incisive. The encyclopedia praised the story's morally ambiguous treatment of the opposing factions, particularly its refusal to romanticize violence committed by those resisting the Fractale system. It also noted the darker elements involving the abuse of Phryne and the original girl on whom she was based. The review identified the influence of Studio Ghibli and considered the animation generally solid, while regarding the show's thematic ambitions and setting as its principal strengths.
