= Quily =

Quily Killi
- Part of Val d'Oust
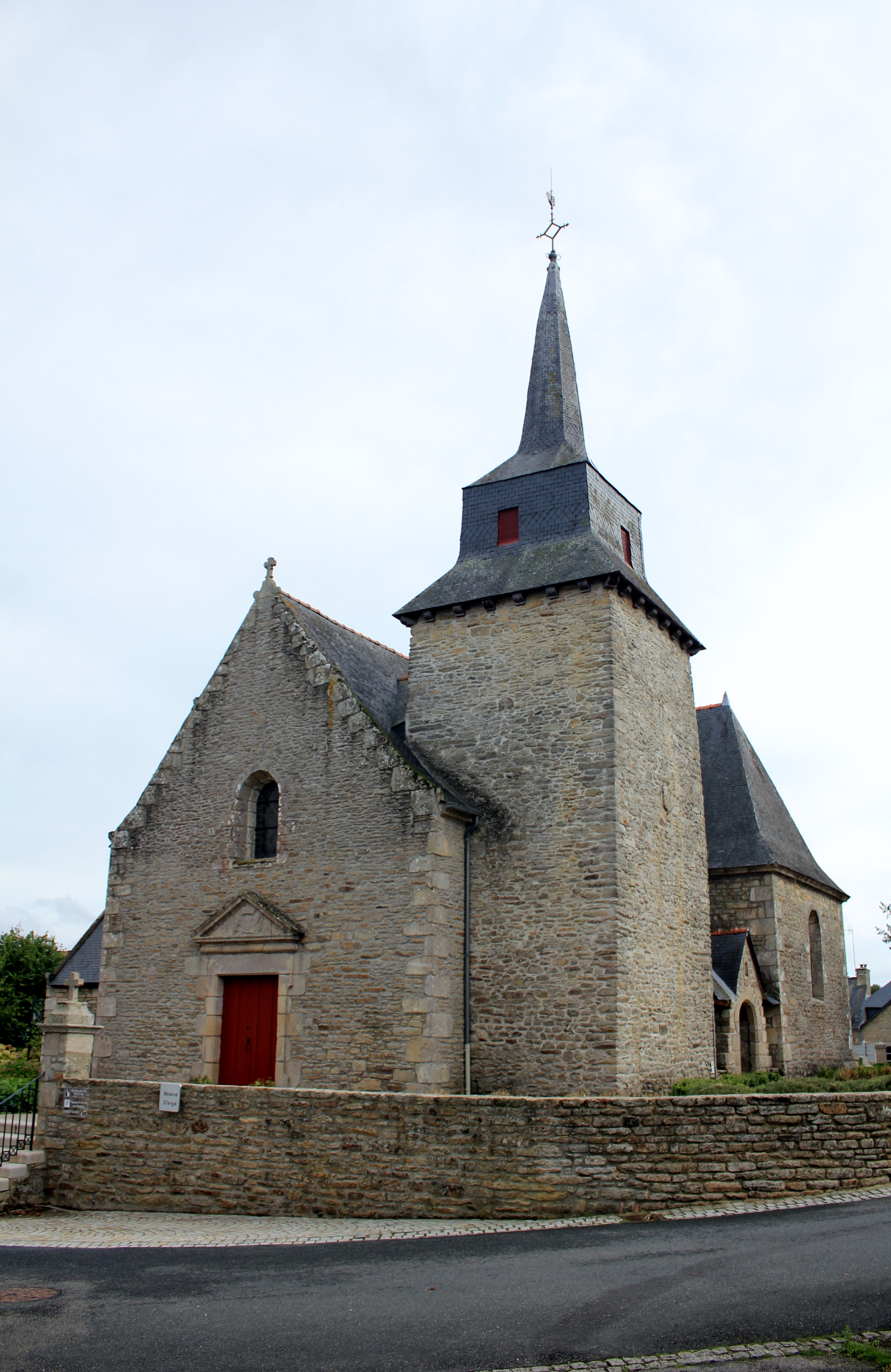
- The Church of Saint-Nicodème, in Quily
- Location of Quily
- Location within France Location within Brittany
- Coordinates: 47°53′30″N 2°28′39″W
- Country: France
- Region: Brittany
- Department: Morbihan
- Arrondissement: Pontivy
- Canton: Ploërmel
- Commune: Val d'Oust
- Area^{1}: 5.39 km^{2} (2.08 sq mi)
- Highest elevation: 133 m (436 ft)
- Lowest elevation: 19 m (62 ft)
- Population (2022): 366
  - Density: 67.9/km^{2} (176/sq mi)
- Time zone: UTC+01:00 (CET)
  - Summer (DST): UTC+02:00 (CEST)
- Postal code: 56800
- ^{1} French Land Register data, which excludes lakes, ponds, glaciers > 1 km^{2} (0.386 sq mi or 247 acres) and river estuaries.

Quily (French pronunciation: [kili]; Breton: Killi, meaning "the forest") is a former commune in the Morbihan department of Brittany in north-western France. On 1 January 2016, it was merged into the new commune Val d'Oust. Its population was 366 in 2022. Inhabitants of Quily are called in French Quilyens.

== See also ==
- Communes of the Morbihan department
