= Senyu =

Japanese webcomic and its adaptations

- First tankōbon volume cover (Shueisha's manga)

戦勇。 (Senyū)
- Genre: Fantasy comedy
- Manga
- Written by: Robinson Haruhara
- Published by: Nico Nico Seiga
- Original run: August 27, 2010 – present
- Manga
- Written by: Robinson Haruhara
- Published by: Shueisha
- Imprint: Jump Comics SQ.
- Magazine: Jump Square
- Original run: May 2, 2012 – April 4, 2013
- Volumes: 2
- Manga

Senyu: Main Quest
- Written by: Robinson Haruhara
- Published by: Kodansha
- Magazine: Suiyōbi no Sirius
- Original run: August 21, 2013 – May 14, 2014
- Volumes: 9
- Series titles
- 1. Dai-1 Shō (2013–14, 3 volumes); 2. Dai-2 Shō (2013–14, 6 volumes)
- Anime television series
- Directed by: Yutaka Yamamoto
- Produced by: Akira Sasaki
- Written by: Michiko Yokote
- Music by: Makoto Wakatabe; Daisuke Sakabe
- Studio: Liden Films; Ordet
- Licensed by: NA: Crunchyroll
- Original network: TV Tokyo
- Original run: January 9, 2013 – September 25, 2013
- Episodes: 26
- icon

Senyu (戦勇。, Senyū) is a Japanese web manga series written and illustrated by Robinson Haruhara. It started publishing in Nico Nico Seiga website in August 2010; five parts have been released, in addition to a parallel series titled Senyu+. A print version was published in Shueisha's shōnen manga magazine Jump Square from May 2012 to April 2013, with its chapters collected in two tankōbon. Another series, titled Senyu: Main Quest, was published in two parts in Kodansha's Suiyōbi no Sirius online manga section of Nico Nico Seiga from August 2013 to March 2017, with the overall series collected in nine tankōbon volumes.

A 26-episode anime television series was broadcast for two seasons in 2013.

== Plot ==
A millennium ago, the Demon King wreaked havoc in the human realm, but was sealed by the legendary Hero Creasion. Closer to the story's present, a large hole appeared in the world, from which a large number of demons emerged. The King has ordered the 75 probable descendants of the original hero to destroy the demons and save the world. The story follows Alba, hero number 45, and his quest to save the world. Along the way, he is accompanied by Royal Soldier Ross, whose somewhat sadistic, antagonistic antics serve as comic relief. Alba quickly teams up with the demon queen herself, who is soon revealed to be a naive, young pink-haired girl who accidentally instigated the demon crisis while making popcorn.

The series starts almost exclusively comedic, with episodic gags mainly involving Alba's bad luck and Ross's abuses. A more serialized story develops halfway into the first part, as an order of twelve powerful demons themed after the twelve months of the Gregorian Calendar starts attempting to revive the original Demon King. Simultaneously, other probable hero descendants also interfere, with lesser demons and government officials caught in the crossfire.

The world's past and Creasion's origins are explored in the second part, culminating in the supposed defeat of the story's main antagonist, the first Demon King. The third part focuses on the remnants of the twelve demons, especially the strange machinations of one of them, Elf November. The fourth volume explores Elf's past and his complex involvement with existence, concluding Senyu's main storyline.

The fifth part serves as an epilogue, elaborating upon the original story and later shifting to a comedic slice of life where the characters adapt to the world after the chaos wrought by the catastrophic events explained in previous parts. The later portion of the fifth part explores some aspects of Elf's past and introduces a new group of antagonists.

== Characters ==
Alba (アルバ, Aruba)
Voiced by: Hiro Shimono
Alba serves as the main character in the first two parts, though he takes a smaller—albeit significant—role as a side character in the third and fifth parts. Alba is the 45th hero sent out by the King to stop the Demon Lord and travels around with the soldier Ross. Ross usually physically and verbally abuses him, as Alba often acts as the straight man in tsukkomi comedic routines.
Ross (ロス, Rosu)
Voiced by: Yuichi Nakamura
Ross is the soldier that was sent out with the 45th hero Alba to stop the Demon Lord. He often physically abuses Alba for comedic purposes and the two usually engage in tsukkomi. He possesses extensive knowledge on the nature of the demon crisis—much of which is unknown to his acquaintances—and is one of the most important characters during the whole manga's run.
Ruki (ルキ)
Voiced by: Ai Kayano
Ruki is the Third Demon Lord. She is several hundred years old, but only became the new Demon Lord ten years ago and therefore identifies as a ten-year-old. While trying to make popcorn, she accidentally released all the monsters onto the human world and is currently traveling around to bring back the twelve great demons.
Foyfoy (フォイフォイ, Foifoi)
Voiced by: Kenichi Suzumura
The 23rd hero sent out by the King to stop the Demon Lord. He is initially antagonistic towards the trio, but later proves to be a noble and useful ally. In later chapters, he becomes the head butler of the King's castle, and in volume 3, the first-year teacher of the Hero Academy.
Janua Ein (ヤヌア・アイン, Yanua Ain)
Voiced by: Takahiro Sakurai
One of the twelve demons that Ruki is searching for. Janua has super strength and is obsessed with ninjas, basing his moves and mannerisms around them. Carefree and childish, he is close friends with the comically hypermasculine Samejima, a lower-ranking demon. Janua is not very loyal to the twelve demons and befriends and becomes an ally with the trio roughly halfway through Volume 1. He possesses unique teletransportation abilities with next to no limitations, which makes him key in the plan of the twelve to revive the Demon King.
Dezember Zwolf (ディツェンバー・ツヴォルフ, Ditsenbā Tsuvorufu)
Voiced by: Takayuki Kondo
One of the twelve demons that Ruki is searching for. The de facto leader of the 12 demons, he is a fanatic set out to revive the Demon King. To do this, he brought together the 12 demons, each of whom has an ability necessary for his plan (or direct firepower). He serves as the main antagonist of the first part and early second part, and a supporting one in the third part.
Elf November (エルフ・ノベンバー, Erufu Nobenbā)
Voiced by: Hiroshi Okamoto
Elf is another demon who Ruki is searching for. He is mischievous and his motivations are by far the most ambiguous in the series, both helping the heroes and backstabbing them and the other demons on a whim. Later revealed to be immensely powerful and deeply related to the world's past, he is implied to be responsible for most of the events in Senyu's narrative. He serves as a supporting antagonist in the first and second parts, later becoming the main villain in the third part and the protagonist in the fourth part.

== Media ==
=== Manga ===
==== Webcomic ====
Written and illustrated by Robinson Haruhara, Senyu started on Nico Nico Seiga website on August 27, 2010. The first part finished on June 17, 2011, and a second part was published from July 1 of that same year, to February 22, 2013. A third part was published from March 1, 2013, to July 4, 2014. A fourth part was published from August 22, 2014, to February 27, 2015. A parallel story, titled Senyu+, was published from April 10, 2015, to February 22, 2019; on that same day, a fifth part of Senyu started.

==== Print versions ====
Haruhara published a print version of the series in Shueisha's shōnen manga magazine Jump Square from May 2, 2012, to April 4, 2013. Its chapters were collected in two tankōbon volumes, released on December 4, 2012, and July 4, 2013.

Another series, titled Senyu: Main Quest Dai-1 Shō (戦勇。メインクエスト第一章; 'Senyu Main Quest: Chapter 1'), was published in Kodansha's Suiyōbi no Sirius online manga section of Nico Nico Seiga from August 21, 2013, to May 14, 2014. Kodansha collected its chapters in three tankōbon volumes, released from October 9, 2013, to June 9, 2014.

A sequel, titled Senyu: Main Quest Dai-2 Shō (戦勇。メインクエスト第二章; 'Senyu Main Quest: Chapter 2'), was published in Suiyōbi no Sirius from June 25, 2014, to March 1, 2014. Kodansha collected its chapters in six tankōbon volumes, released from December 4, 2014, to May 9, 2017.

=== Anime ===
An anime television series adaptation was announced in August 2012. Directed by Yutaka Yamamoto and produced by Liden Films and Ordet, it was broadcast on TV Tokyo; the first part was broadcast from January 9 to April 3, 2013, while the second season aired from July 3 to September 25 of that same year. For the first season, JAM Project performed both the opening and ending themes "The Monsters" and "Believe -Eien no Link-" (Believe〜永遠のLink〜), respectively. For the second season, Granrodeo performed the opening theme "Canary" (カナリヤ, Kanariya), while Alba performed the ending theme "Questers!". Additional original animation DVD (OAD) episodes were bundled with the series' Blu-ray Disc and DVD releases on October 25 and November 22, 2013.

Both season were streamed by Crunchyroll.

==== Episodes ====
===== Season 1 =====
No.	Title	Original release date
1	"The Hero Journeys Forth" "Yuusha, Tabidatsu" (旅立つ。)	January 9, 2013
2	"The Hero's Encounter" "Yuusha, Deau" (出会う。)	January 16, 2013
3	"The Hero Regrets" "Yuusha, Kuyamu" (悔やむ。)	January 23, 2013
4	"The Hero Gets Flustered" "Yuusha, Aseru" (焦る。)	January 30, 2013
5	"The Hero Gets Excited" "Yuusha, Furuitatsu" (奮い立つ。)	February 6, 2013
6	"The Hero Runs" "Yuusha, Kakeru" (駆ける。)	February 13, 2013
7	"The Hero is Shocked" "Yuusha, Shinkan Su" (震撼す。)	February 20, 2013
8	"A Hero Gets Tried" "Yuusha, Hihei Suru" (疲弊する。)	February 27, 2013
9	"The Hero is at a Loss" "Yuusha, Konwaku Suru" (困惑する。)	March 6, 2013
10	"The Hero Is Shocked" "Yuusha, Kyougaku Suru" (驚愕する。)	March 13, 2013
11	"The Hero Gets Depressed" "Yuusha, Meiru" (滅入る。)	March 20, 2013
12	"The Hero Gets Confused" "Yuusha, Konran Suru" (混乱する。)	March 27, 2013
13	"The Hero is Left Behind" "Yuusha, Nokosareru" (残される。)	April 3, 2013

===== Season 2 =====
No.	Title	Original release date
14	"The Hero Broods" "Yuusha, Omoinayamu" (勇者, 思い悩む。)	July 3, 2013
15	"The Hero Is Stunned" "Yuusha, Azen to Suru" (勇者, 唖然とする。)	July 10, 2013
16	"The Hero Is Set Up" "Yuusha, Hamerareru" (勇者, 嵌められる。)	July 17, 2013
17	"The Hero Is Overwhelmed" "Yuusha, Attou Sareru" (勇者, 圧倒される。)	July 24, 2013
18	"The Hero Is Terrified" "Yuusha, Senritsu Suru" (勇者, 戦慄する。)	July 31, 2013
19	"The Hero Becomes Speechless" "Yuusha, Zekku Suru" (勇者、絶句する。)	August 7, 2013
20	"The Hero Falls Silent" "Yuusha, Chinmoku Suru" (勇者、沈黙する。)	August 14, 2013
21	"The Hero Transforms" "Yuusha, Henbou Suru" (勇者、変貌する。)	August 21, 2013
22	"The Hero Reunites" "Yuusha, Saikai Suru" (勇者、再会する。)	August 28, 2013
23	"The Hero Falls" "Yuusha, Tsukiru" (勇者, 尽きる。)	September 4, 2013
24	"The Hero Unleashed" "Yuusha, Tokihanatsu" (勇者, 解き放つ。)	September 11, 2013
25	"The Hero Decides" "Yuusha, Kettei Suru" (勇者, 決定する。)	September 18, 2013
26	"The Hero Returns" "Yuusha, Kikan Suru" (勇者、帰還する。)	September 25, 2013

== See also ==
- 'Tis Time for "Torture," Princess, another manga series by the same author
