= Le Roc-Saint-André =

Le Roc-Saint-André Roz-Sant-Andrev
- Part of Val d'Oust
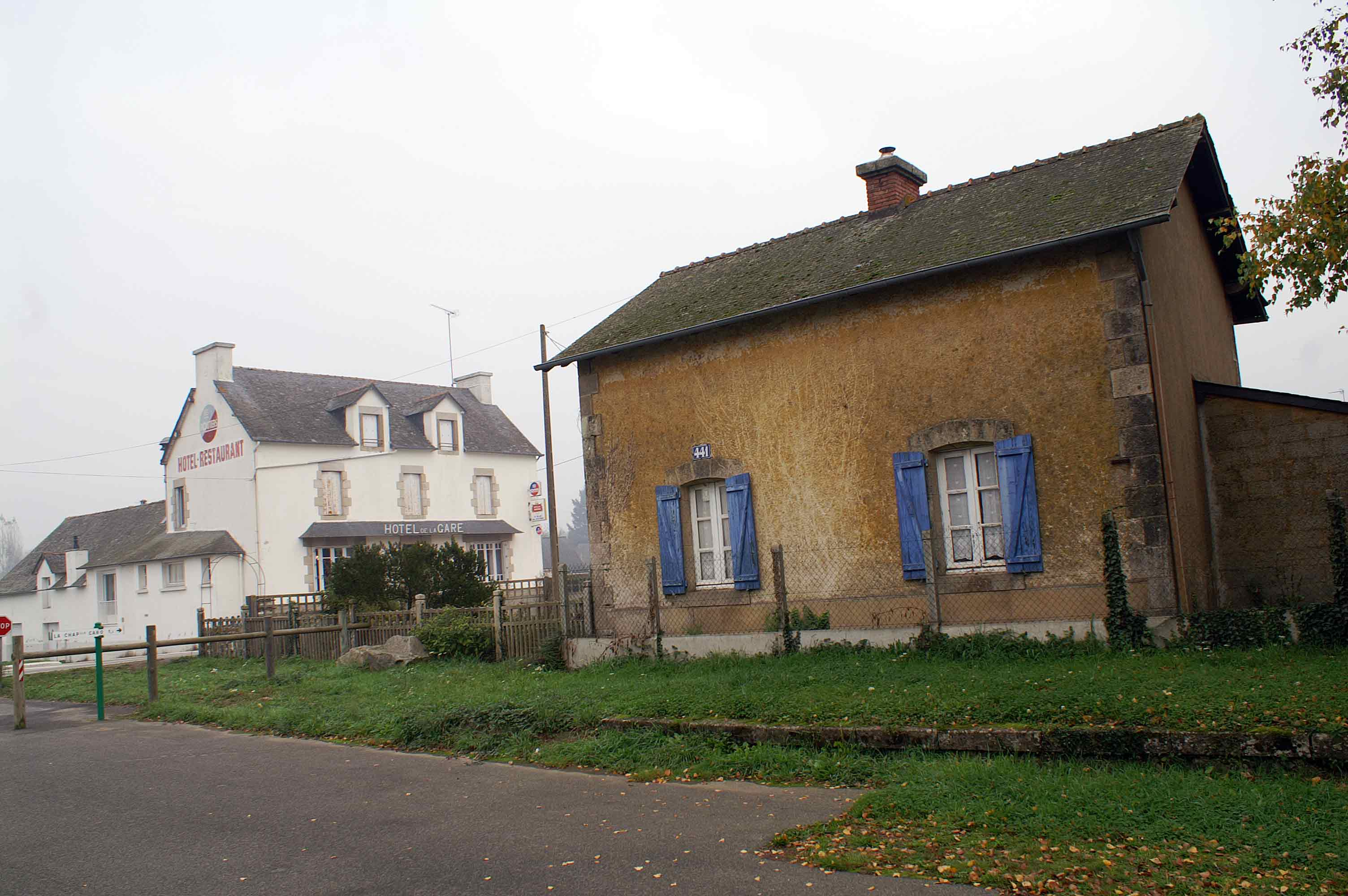
- The former Roc-Saint-André-La Chapelle railway station

- Coat of arms
- Location of Le Roc-Saint-André
- Location within France Location within Brittany
- Coordinates: 47°51′55″N 2°26′52″W
- Country: France
- Region: Brittany
- Department: Morbihan
- Arrondissement: Pontivy
- Canton: Moréac
- Commune: Val d'Oust
- Area^{1}: 9.93 km^{2} (3.83 sq mi)
- Highest elevation: 123 m (404 ft)
- Lowest elevation: 16 m (52 ft)
- Population (2022): 974
  - Density: 98.1/km^{2} (254/sq mi)
- Time zone: UTC+01:00 (CET)
  - Summer (DST): UTC+02:00 (CEST)
- Postal code: 56460
- ^{1} French Land Register data, which excludes lakes, ponds, glaciers > 1 km^{2} (0.386 sq mi or 247 acres) and river estuaries.

Le Roc-Saint-André (French pronunciation: [lə ʁɔk sɛ̃.t‿ɑ̃dʁe]; Breton: Roz-Sant-Andrev) is a former commune in the Morbihan department of Brittany in north-western France. On 1 January 2016, it was merged into the new commune Val d'Oust. Inhabitants of Le Roc-Saint-André are called in French Roxédois.

== See also ==
- Communes of the Morbihan department
