= A-bout! =

Japanese manga series

- First tankōbon volume cover, featuring Asagiri Shinnosuke
- Genre: Yankī
- Manga
- Written by: Masa Ichikawa
- Published by: Kodansha
- Magazine: Weekly Shōnen Magazine
- Original run: November 25, 2009 – May 15, 2013
- Volumes: 19
- Manga

A-bout!! – Asagiri Daikatsuyaku-hen
- Written by: Masa Ichikawa
- Published by: Kodansha
- Magazine: Weekly Shōnen Magazine (2013–14); Magazine Special (2014)
- Original run: June 12, 2013 – May 20, 2014
- Volumes: 5
- Manga

A-bout! Surf
- Written by: Masa Ichikawa
- Published by: Kodansha
- Magazine: Evening
- Original run: July 13, 2021 – September 27, 2022
- Volumes: 3
- icon

A-bout! (stylized as A-BOUT!) is a Japanese manga series written and illustrated by Masa Ichikawa. It was serialized in Kodansha's shōnen manga magazine Weekly Shōnen Magazine from November 2009 to May 2013, with its chapters collected in 19 tankōbon volumes. It was followed by a sequel, A-bout!! – Asagiri Daikatsuyaku-hen, which ran in the same magazine from June 2013 to March 2014 and concluded in Magazine Special in May of the same year. A third series, A-bout! Surf, was serialized in Kodansha's seinen manga magazine Evening from July 2021 to September 2022.

== Plot ==
The story takes place in Mitsumine High School, the school is notorious for its violent juvenile delinquent students. When Asagiri Shinnosuke transfers to this school, he starts fighting all the class bosses to prove himself as the strongest guy in the school.

== Publication ==
A-bout!, written and illustrated by Masa Ichikawa, was serialized in Kodansha's Weekly Shōnen Magazine from November 25, 2009, to May 15, 2013. Kodansha collected its 165 chapters in 19 tankōbon volumes, released from March 17, 2010, to June 17, 2013.

A direct sequel, A-bout!! - Asagiri Daikatsuyaku-hen (A-BOUT!!〜朝桐大活躍編〜), was serialized in Weekly Shōnen Magazine from June 12, 2013, to March 12, 2014. Two additional chapters were published in Magazine Special on April 19 and May 20 of the same year. (Note: The last chapter was published in the magazine's sixth issue of 2014, released on May 20 of the same year.) Kodansha collected its chapters in five tankōbon volumes, released from September 17, 2013, to June 17, 2014.

A third series, titled A-bout! Surf, was serialized in Kodansha's seinen manga magazine Evening from July 13, 2021, to September 27, 2022. Kodansha collected its chapters in five tankōbon volumes, released from September 22, 2021, to November 22, 2022
