= Kannagi: Crazy Shrine Maidens =

Japanese manga series & its franchise

- Cover of volume 1 of Kannagi, published by Ichijinsha, showing Nagi

かんなぎ
- Genre: Romantic comedy, supernatural
- Manga
- Written by: Eri Takenashi
- Published by: Ichijinsha
- English publisher: NA: Bandai Entertainment; (expired)
- Magazine: Comic Rex
- Original run: January 2006 – September 2017
- Volumes: 12
- Anime television series
- Directed by: Yutaka Yamamoto
- Produced by: Atsuhiro Iwakami; Tomonori Ochikoshi; Yōsuke Sugino
- Written by: Hideyuki Kurata
- Music by: Satoru Kōsaki
- Studio: A-1 Pictures; Ordet (production cooperation)
- Licensed by: NA: Bandai Entertainment; (expired)
- Original network: Tokyo MX, MBS, TVQ, RNB, CTC, TBC, TV Saitama, tvk, Animax, CBC, HBC
- Original run: October 4, 2008 – December 27, 2008
- Episodes: 13 + OVA
- Light novel
- Written by: Tōka Takei
- Illustrated by: Eri Takenashi; Kasumu Kirino
- Published by: Ichijinsha
- Imprint: Ichijinsha Bunko
- Published: December 20, 2008

Kannagi: Crazy Shrine Maidens (Japanese: かんなぎ, Hepburn: Kannagi; lit. "Shrine Maiden"), is a Japanese manga series written and illustrated by Eri Takenashi. The manga was serialized in Ichijinsha's Comic Rex magazine from the January 2006 issue to the September 2017 issue. A 13-episode anime adaptation produced by A-1 Pictures aired between October and December 2008 in Japan. An original video animation (OVA) episode was released in May 2009. Bandai Entertainment licensed the manga and anime series, including the OVA.

== Characters ==
=== Main characters ===
Nagi (ナギ)
Voiced by: Haruka Tomatsu
The title character in the series, Nagi, is a goddess who awakens when Jin fashions a sculpture from the wood of a sacred tree. Her mission is to cleanse the impurities of the world, but because her sacred tree was cut down, her powers have weakened significantly, and she is easily harmed by them. She improvises an exorcist staff from a magical girl-themed toy baton.^{[ch. 1]} She has a child-like personality that is a bit mischievous. She states she has a split personality named Kannagi (かんなぎ), who is more serious and polite. (Note: When Kannagi's serious personality descends upon Nagi's body, the process cannot last very long as it consumes a significant amount of energy, though this can be prolonged with the help of another person.) When Jin manages to communicate with Kannagi, he hears from her that the events that led to Nagi and Zange's disappearance were caused by her, and it's up to both to decide if they should return or not. Thanks to Jin and his friends, he manages to bring back Nagi.
Jin Mikuriya (御厨 仁, Mikuriya Jin)
Voiced by: Hiro Shimono
After using a part of a fallen sacred tree to make a sculpture of a girl for his art project, he inadvertently brings Nagi back to life. He lets Nagi stay at his house, and helps her with catching impurities as he can sense them and catch them with his bare hands.^{[ch. 1]} Later, when Nagi was frustrated by being uncertain about her own identity, Jin decides to assist Nagi in tracing back her origin. He enjoys Worcester sauce on a slice of bread or a bowl of rice. Despite having issues with Nagi's lazy and demanding behavior, Jin eventually falls in love with her, realizing that just before she is turned into a corrupt goddess and exorcised by Zange. Thanks to Hinoue's advice, Jin develops the power of clairvoyance in an attempt to track down Nagi. He later manages to bring Nagi back to life by carving another sculpture of hers with wood from the same tree, but gets heartbroken upon learning that she has lost her memories of their time living together. Thanks to his friends' help, Jin manages to have Nagi recover her memories.
Tsugumi Aoba (青葉 つぐみ, Aoba Tsugumi)
Voiced by: Miyuki Sawashiro
Tsugumi is Jin's childhood best friend who is charged with looking after him while Jin's father is away. She harbors a crush on him and gets concerned when she discovers Jin is living alone with another girl.^{[ch. 1]}
Zange (ざんげ) (Note: The word "zange" means penitence or confession)
Voiced by: Kana Hanazawa
Nagi's twin sister is a goddess whose tree is still intact and located in a church's courtyard, thus she is still able to catch and cleanse impurities by herself. Her appearance is that of a Catholic nun, as it is a stronger religion nowadays, according to her, which contributed to her divinity staying intact. She possesses Hakua Suzushiro and becomes a Japanese idol with numerous local television appearances. Despite seemingly being kind and caring on the outside, she usually takes advantage of Nagi's weakened state to torment her. When Nagi is overwhelmed with impurity, Zange makes use of all the sacred power amassed by her so far to exorcise her sister, which puts a strain on her relationship with Hakua, who forces her out of her body. Despite feeling satisfaction upon succeeding, she starts behaving differently soon after, as if she were doing that under some kind of influence, and upon realizing this, Hakua makes amends with Zange, who returns to her body.
Hakua Suzushiro (涼城 白亜, Suzushiro Hakua)
Voiced by: Kana Hanazawa
Hakua is a girl from Jin's school possessed by Zange. Since childhood, Hakua was able to see spiritual images around her, and her body has been very susceptible to spiritual possession. As other children considered her ability very odd, she had trouble interacting with children of her age. When she was still a child, she made a friend with Jin during a summer camp, who did not consider her ability strange, as he also possessed a strong spiritual sense. However, Jin ends up forgetting about her after they lose contact and only remembers it after Nagi and Zange disappear. Since then, Hakua has not been able to go outside her house, and she compared herself to a "princess locked up in a castle". Just before Hakua attempted to commit suicide due to depression, she "willingly accepted" Zange to be her host. However, Nagi claims that despite this, it may put too much stress on her body. Both Zange and Hakua develop a liking for Jin and decide to bring him to their side, but when Zange purifies Nagi and makes her disappear, Hakua is distraught with Jin's despair over losing her and expels Zange, reclaiming control of her body. However, she later realizes that just like Nagi, Zange was under the control of an external force and was not responsible for erasing her sister, thus she decides to meet her once more to make amends with her. Hakua and Zange manage to fuse once more during the school festival after Jin and his friends manage to revive Nagi.

=== Art club members ===
Daitetsu Hibiki (響 大鉄, Hibiki Daitetsu)
Voiced by: Takanori Hoshino
Daitetsu Hibiki is Jin's friend and a member of the art club. He seems to be talented at everything from singing to sculpting, and Jin hopes to one day be as good as him. Despite his imposing figure, he can be sensitive and has a surprising love for cats.
Meguru Akiba (秋葉 巡, Akiba Meguru)
Voiced by: Tetsuya Kakihara
Akiba is one of the three male members of the art club. He claims to have joined the art club instead of the manga club because he could not stand the otaku behavior of its members, although Akiba is quite the otaku himself. He dedicated himself to drawing manga. He often launches himself into very long and detailed diatribes, speaking so quickly that people end up just ignoring him.
Shino Ōkouchi (大河内 紫乃, Ōkouchi Shino)
Voiced by: Mai Nakahara
Shino is the vice-president of the art club. She is a quiet member who is close friends with Takako and is often observant of the male members' personalities. She especially takes an interest in how Jin interacts with Nagi.
Takako Kimura (木村 貴子, Kimura Takako)
Voiced by: Risa Hayamizu
Takako is the presiding president of the art club, as well as a fujoshi, even though she knows very little about anime, manga, or games. She enjoys teasing the male members of the art club. She is a devoted fan of Nagi's, being a member of her fan club at the school.

=== Others ===
Reiri Suzushiro (涼城 怜悧, Suzushiro Reiri)
Voiced by: Kenta Miyake
The teacher of religious studies and Hakua's father. He is aware of his daughter being possessed by Zange and easily figures out Nagi's identity. He is worried about Hakua's condition. Although Hakua "claims" to do so by free will, he gets himself a little relief when Nagi promises him to find a way to make Zange leave her body.
Ozma (大東, Ozuma)
A mysterious boy created from a huge mass of impurity that seems to have some connection with Nagi. When he finally meets her, their bodies fuse, and she turns into a corrupted god until Zange exorcises her. According to Hinoue, Ozma was an important religious adept who published several historical texts, including one about Kannagi.
Shouhou Hinoue (火上 祥峰, Hinoue Shōhō)
A Buddhist monk in training who takes shelter in Jin's house following Nagi's disappearance. Upon feeling traces of Nagi's presence there, Hinoue learns from Jin about her and decides to join forces with him to bring her back. Despite looking like a boy, Hinoue is actually a girl, a fact she keeps a secret from the others, except for Hakua, who discovers it by accident, and Nagi, who finds out by herself. Her cooking and cleaning can impress even Tsugumi, who is rather confident about her domestic skills.

== Media ==
=== Manga ===
Kannagi began as a manga series written and illustrated by Eri Takenashi and began serialization in the inaugural January 2006 issue of Ichijinsha's shōnen manga magazine Comic Rex sold on December 9, 2005. The manga went on a hiatus in December 2008 after Takenashi developed a subarachnoid hemorrhage in November 2008. The manga resumed with the September 2011 issue of Comic Rex on July 27, 2011, but due to ongoing concerns for her health, Takenashi warned in June 2011 that the series' publishing schedule would be irregular, though her goal was for a bi-monthly release. The series concluded in the September 2017 issue of Comic Rex released on July 27, 2017.

The first tankōbon volume was released on August 9, 2006, under Ichijinsha's Rex Comics imprint; as of July 27, 2016, 11 volumes have been released in Japan. Bandai Entertainment licensed the manga for distribution in North America. However, after publishing the first three volumes in the series, further releases were halted in 2012 as a result of Bandai Entertainment's restructuring.

A spin-off manga titled Kanpachi: Crazy Seriola Dumerili written and illustrated by Takenashi's brother Shinichi Yuhki was serialized from March 9, 2010, to March 26, 2016, in Comic Rex. The first volume was released on October 27, 2010; as of June 27, 2013, five volumes have been released.

=== Internet radio show ===
An Internet radio show to promote the anime series was broadcast between June 11, 2008, and April 7, 2009, with ten episodes being produced. The show is hosted by Haruka Tomatsu (who plays Nagi in the anime), Hideyuki Kurata (the anime's screenwriter), and Yutaka Yamamoto (the anime's director). The broadcasts are distributed on the anime's official website.

=== Anime ===
An anime adaptation was produced by the animation studio A-1 Pictures, directed by Yutaka Yamamoto, and with screenplay by Hideyuki Kurata. The anime aired in Japan between October 4 and December 27, 2008, and consisted of thirteen episodes. The anime was dropped by the satellite channel BS11 Digital before it started airing; no explanation was given. An original video animation episode was shipped with the final Japanese DVD volume on May 27, 2009. Bandai Entertainment licensed the anime and released the first of two seven-episode DVD compilation volumes on July 17, 2009. The second volume was released on September 24, 2009.

=== Light novel ===
A light novel written by Tōka Takei, with illustrations by Eri Takenashi and Kasumu Kirino, was published by Ichijinsha under their Ichijinsha Bunko imprint on December 20, 2008.
