= Ordet (studio) =

Japanese animation studio

Ordet Co., Ltd.
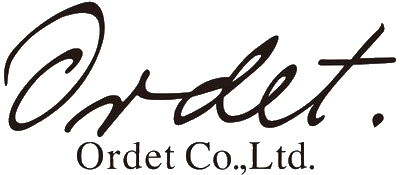

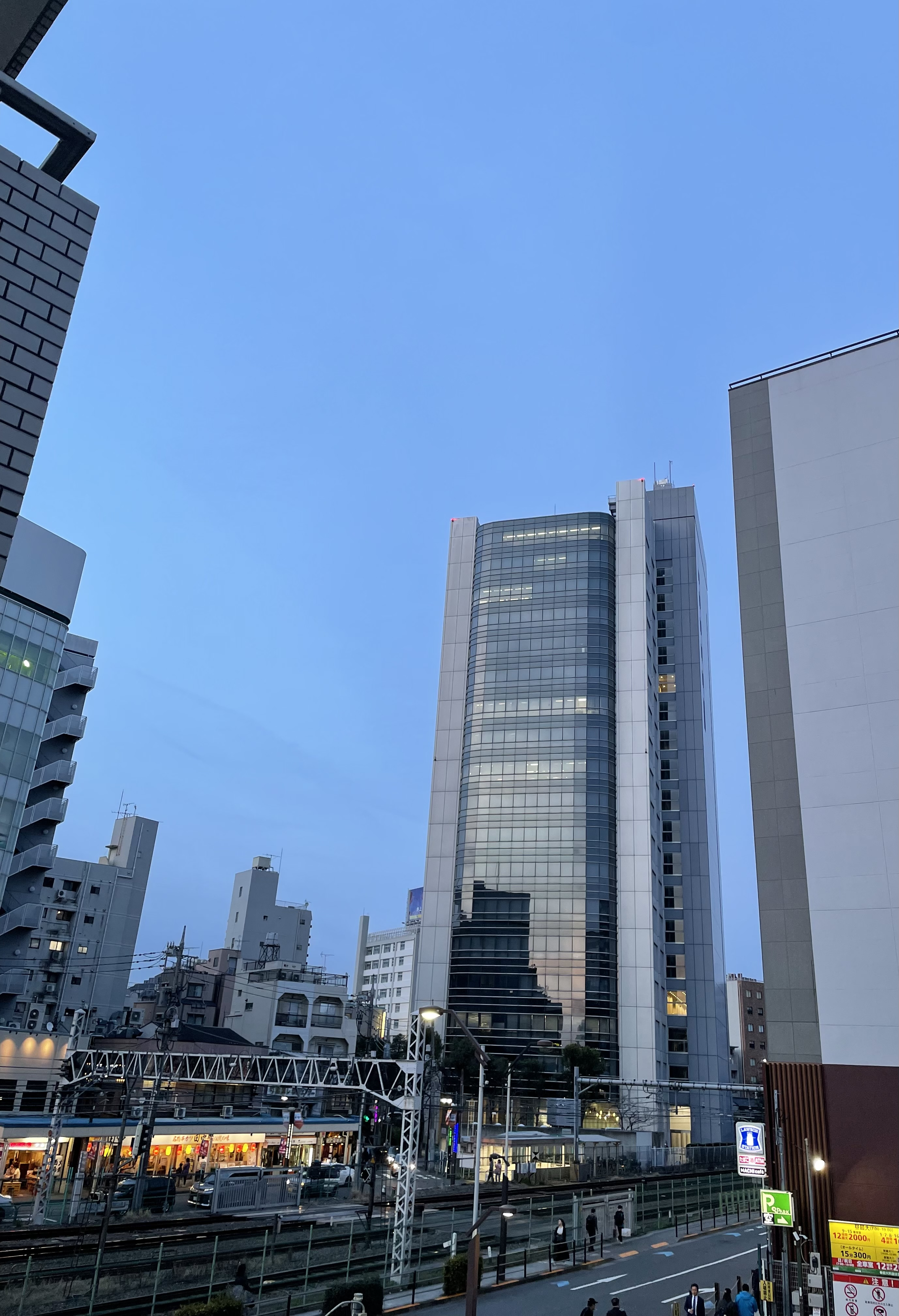
- Headquarters in Suginami, Tokyo
- Native name: 株式会社オース
- Romanized name: Kabushiki-gaisha Ōsu
- Type: Kabushiki kaisha
- Industry: Animation studio and production enterprise
- Founded: August 10, 2007; 19 years ago
- Founders: Yutaka Yamamoto
- Defunct: March 1, 2025; 19 months ago
- Fate: Absorbed into Ultra Super Pictures
- Headquarters: Kamiogi, Suginami, Tokyo, Japan
- Parent: Ultra Super Pictures
- Website: https://uspi.jp/ordet/

Ordet Co., Ltd. (Japanese: 株式会社オース, Hepburn: Kabushiki-gaisha Ōsu) was a Japanese animation studio, founded in 2007 by ex-Kyoto Animation director Yutaka Yamamoto and other staff. The company's name, "Ordet," means "the word" in Danish, Swedish, and Norwegian. The company initially served as a subcontractor before producing their first fully solo work, an OVA episode of Black Rock Shooter, which aired in the spring of 2010. This was followed up with an 8-episode series that aired on noitamina from February 2, 2012, to March 22, 2012. In 2011, with studios Sanzigen and Trigger, Ordet joined the Ultra Super Pictures joint holding company.

== Business ==
Ordet was founded in 2007 by Yutaka Yamamoto after being fired by his former employer Kyoto Animation during the production of Lucky Star. After Lucky Star completed its run, several members of the Kyoto Animation staff left the company and followed Yamamoto. Together, they founded Ordet with approximately ¥ 3 million of capital stock. On March 1, 2025, Ordet shuttered its operations and was folded into USP.

== Staff ==
Former staff

- Yutaka Yamamoto - Company representative director, founder, staff director
- Shinobu Yoshioka - Staff director
- Satoshi Kadowaki - Animation director, key animator
- Emi Kesamaru - Art settings, background artist
- Yoko Takada - Key animator

== Works ==
=== TV series ===
- Kannagi: Crazy Shrine Maidens (2008, production co-operation, animation production by A-1 Pictures)
- Fractale (2011, production co-operation, animation production by A-1 Pictures)
- Black Rock Shooter (2012, with Sanzigen)
- Senyu (2013, with Liden Films)
- Senyu 2 (2013, with Liden Films)
- Wake Up, Girls! (2014, with Tatsunoko Production)

=== Films ===
- Wake Up, Girls! - Seven Idols (2014, with Tatsunoko Production)
- Wake Up, Girls! Seishun no Kage (2015, with Millepensee)
- Wake Up, Girls! Beyond the Bottom (2015, with Millepensee)

=== OVAs ===
- Kannagi: Crazy Shrine Maidens (2009, production co-operation, animation production by A-1 Pictures)
- Black Rock Shooter (2010)
- Miyakawa-ke no Kūfuku (2013, with Encourage Films)

=== ONAs ===
- Blossom (2012)
- Wake Up, Girl ZOO! (2014–2015, with Studio Moriken)
