= Yutaka Yamamoto =

Japanese anime director (born 1974)

- 山本 寛
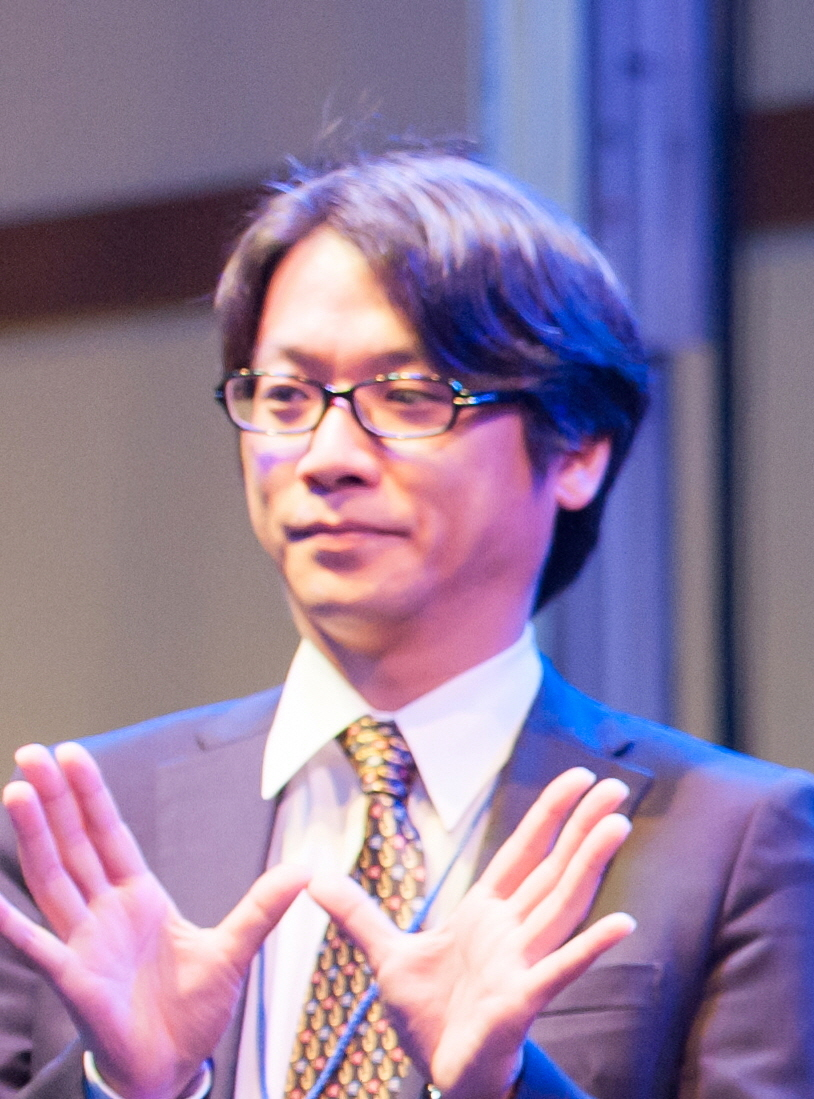
- Yamamoto at Anime Central 2014
- Born: September 1, 1974 (age 52); Minoh, Osaka, Japan
- Occupations: anime director, blogger
- Years active: 1998–present
- Notable work: Fractale; Watashi no Yasashiku nai Senpai; Wake Up, Girls!

Yutaka Yamamoto (山本 寛, Yamamoto Yutaka; born September 1, 1974) is a Japanese anime director from Osaka Prefecture. He helped co-found Ordet.

== Biography ==
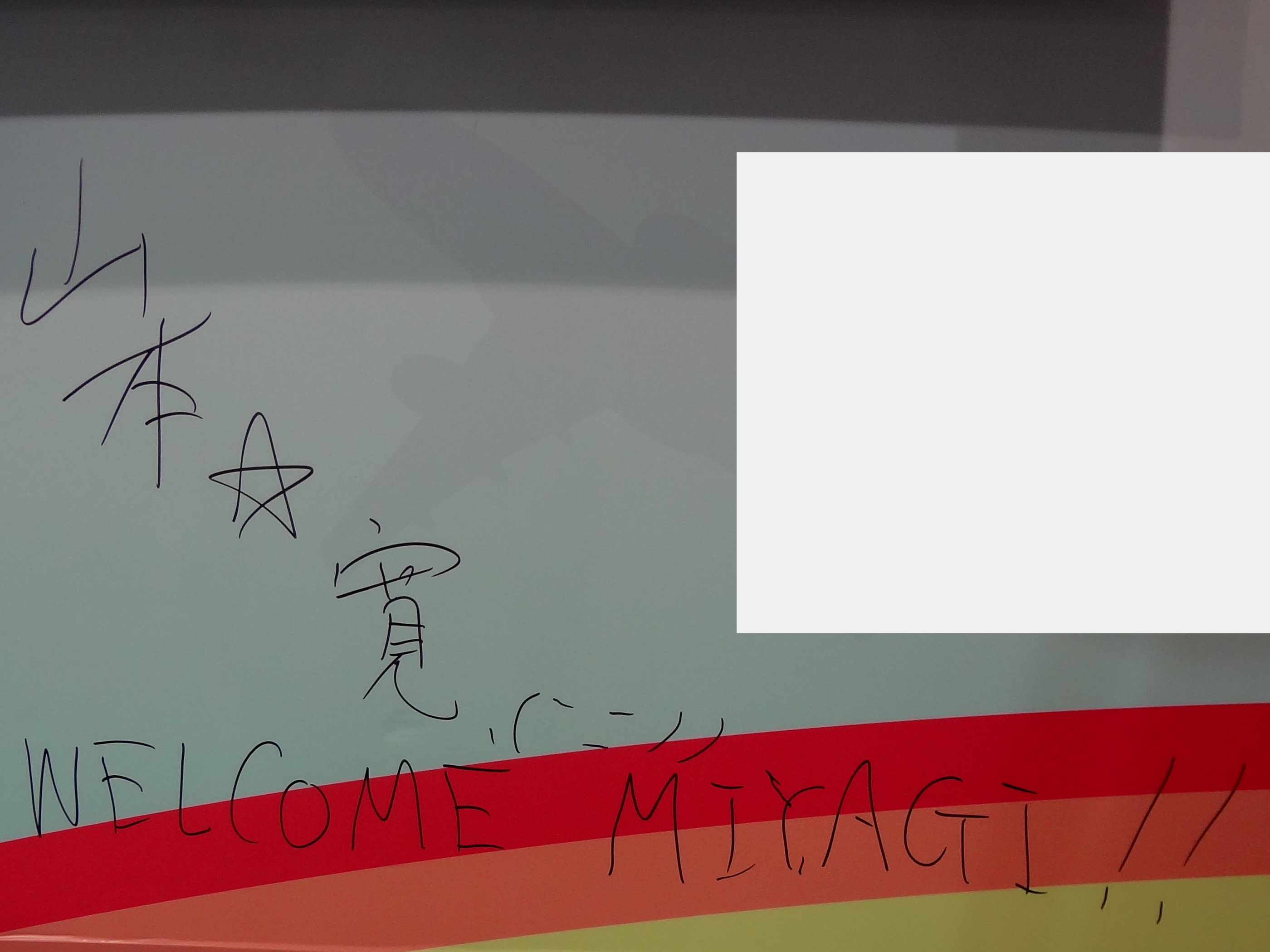
Yutaka Yamamoto's signature at 2016 Taipei International Comics & Animation Festival

As a member of Kyoto Animation, Yamamoto rose to prominence within the company after serving as an assistant director on Munto 2: Beyond the Walls of Time. In 2006, he was selected to be the series production director of The Melancholy of Haruhi Suzumiya, after which he became well known among anime fans choreographing the dance to "Hare Hare Yukai", the ending theme song. He was to make his full directorial debut with Lucky Star, but was replaced after four episodes due to "performance issues". In a later radio interview, Yamamoto confirmed he was fired by Kyoto Animation and unsuccessfully attempted to win back his job. He later assumed the position of Ordet's president. In 2008, he directed Kannagi: Crazy Shrine Maidens with Ordet and A-1 Pictures.

In 2009, he directed a 90-second short film for inclusion in the fourth volume of the Tonari no 801-chan manga. The short was produced by A-1 Pictures and featured character designs by Satoshi Kadowaki. Production of the short came after the announcement that Kyoto Animation would be producing a Tonari no 801-chan television series. However, less than two weeks later, the series was canceled without explanation by its broadcaster, TBS. Yamamoto wrote that the short was a chance to "avenge myself" on his blog.

His next project was Black Rock Shooter, an OVA released in July 2010. Yamamoto was the supervising director for the project. It was Ordet's first solo production as the main animation studio, while Shinobu Yoshioka, another former Kyoto Animation member, directed it. Yamamoto attended the American anime convention Otakon in 2009. In early 2011, Yamamoto directed the anime Fractale with production by A-1 Pictures and Ordet. He directed three films and a television series for Wake Up, Girls!, but was removed as director for the sequel series. Yamamoto was fired by Ordet on March 25, 2016. On February 25, 2017, he announced his next work would be an original anime film titled Hakubo, to be financed via crowdfunding. Yamamoto served as writer and director on the film, which was released in 2019. On March 4, 2019, the Tokyo District Court commenced bankruptcy proceedings against Yamamoto. His lawyer stated that this would not affect his Hakubo film project.

Yamamoto has threatened to quit his career in anime production six times over the years. In May 2019, Yamamoto vowed never to "work on anything related to animation again" after finishing Hakubo. He has become notorious for his incendiary behavior on Twitter, including calling fans of anime "[mentally] disabled", discriminatory remarks about Chinese and Korean anime fans, and attacking his former cast members, which has resulted in him being temporarily suspended from Twitter in 2018.

In September 2019, Yamamoto announced that he will crowdfund a dark fantasy anime titled Magical Girls on Crowdfire, which is motivated by his anger over the Kyoto Animation arson attack. In March 2022, it was announced the project has been stalled due to the lack of investors.

== Filmography ==
=== Credited as a director ===
- Lucky Star (2007, ep 1-4)
- Kannagi (2008): Also Episode Director (ep 1, 13, OP, ED), Storyboard Artist (ep 1, 7, 13, OP, ED)
- Watashi no Yasashiku nai Senpai (2010)
- Fractale (2011): Also Episode Director (1, 11, OP, ED), Storyboard Artist (1, 11, OP, ED)
- Miyakawa-ke no Kūfuku (2013)
- Senyū (2013): Also Episode Director (ED), Storyboard Artist (1-3), Scriptwriter (5-6, 9, 10)
- Wake Up, Girls! – Seven Idols (2014): Also Original Creator, Storyboard Artist
- Wake Up, Girls! (2014): Also Original Creator
- Wake Up, Girls! The Shadow of Youth (2015): Also Original Creator
- Wake Up, Girls! Beyond the Bottom (2015): Also Original Creator
- Hakubo (2019): Also Original Creator, Sound Director, and Scriptwriter
- Magical Girls (tentative title) Original Creator

=== Other ===
- Generator Gawl (1998): Assistant Episode Director (ep 11)
- Jungle wa Itsumo Hale Nochi Guu Final (2001): Episode Director (ep 7, 8), Storyboard (ep 7, 8)
- Shakugan no Shana Second (2007): Storyboard (OP 2)
- Sketchbook ~full color'S~ (2007): Episode Director (ep 11)
- Persona -trinity soul- (2008): Storyboard (ep 6)
- Black Rock Shooter (2010): Supervising Director
- Mashle: Magic and Muscles (2024): Storyboard (ep 23)

== Sources ==
- Maeda, Hisashi et al. "Lucky☆Star". (May 2007) Newtype USA. p. 67.
