= 2014 in anime =

Events in 2014 in anime.

== Events ==
AnimeJapan had its first edition in March.

== Accolades ==
The Tale of the Princess Kaguya won Best Animated Feature Film and Best Animation by Asia Pacific Screen Awards and the Lost Angeles Film Critics Association respectively. Tamako Love Story won the New Face Award at the 18th Japan Media Arts Festival Awards. The Wind Rises won the Japan Academy Prize for Animation of the Year at the 37th Japan Academy Prize. Puella Magi Madoka Magica the Movie: Rebellion won the Best Theatrical Film Award at the 19th Animation Kobe Awards. Attack on Titan won the 2014 Tokyo Anime Award Festival for Animation of the Year. Kill la Kill and The Idolmaster Movie: Beyond the Brilliant Future! dominated at the Newtype Anime Awards. Kill la Kill received for Best Character Design, Best Screenplay, Best Sound and Best Picture (TV Broadcast) while Idolmaster was awarded Best Theme Song, Best Picture (Film), Best Director and Best Characters (Female).

Hayao Miyazaki was awarded an honorary Oscar at the 6th Annual Governors Awards.

== Releases ==
=== Films ===
A list of anime films that debuted in theaters between 1 January and 31 December 2014.

Release date	English title	Japanese title	Director	Studio
January 25	The Idolmaster Movie: Beyond the Brilliant Future!	THE IDOLM@STER MOVIE Kagayaki no Mukōgawa e!	Atsushi Nishikori	A-1 Pictures
July 15	Appleseed Alpha	Appleseed Alpha	Shinji Aramaki	Sola Digital Arts
November 11	Attack on Titan: Crimson Arrows	Shingeki no Kyojin Zenpen: Guren no Yumiya	Tetsuro Araki	Wit Studio
April 19	Crayon Shin-chan: Serious Battle! Robot Dad Strikes Back!	Eiga Crayon Shin-chan: Gachinko! Gyakushū no Robo Tō-chan	Wataru Takahashi	Shin-Ei Animation
October 11	Happiness Charge Pretty Cure The Movie! Ballerina of the Doll Kingdom	Happiness Charge Pretty Cure!: Ningyō no Kuni no Ballerina	Chiaki Kon	Toei Animation
September 13	Cardfight!! Vanguard: The Movie	Gekijōban Cardfight!! Vanguard: Neon Messiah	Shin Itagaki, Takashi Motoki	Liden Films
September 27	Gekijō-ban gdgd Yōseis tte Iu Eiga wa Dō kana...?	Gekijō-ban gdgd Yōseis tte Iu Eiga wa Dō kana...?	Sōta Sugahara	Bouncy
March 14	Shimajiro and the Whale's Song	Shimajirō to Kujira no Uta	Isamu Hirabayashi	Benesse Corporation
March 8	Hakuoki: Demon of the Fleeting Blossom: Warrior Spirit of the Blue Sky	Hakuōki Dai-nishō Shikon Sōkyū	Osamu Yamasaki	Studio Deen
March 1	Harmonie	Arumoni	Yasuhiro Yoshiura	Studio Rikka, Ultra Super Pictures
June 13	Inazuma Eleven: Chōjigen Dream Match	Inazuma Eleven: Chōjigen Dream Match	Katsuhito Akiyama	OLM
September 27	Konna Watashi-tachi ga Nariyuki de Heroine ni Natta Kekka www 'Narihero www'	Konna Watashi-tachi ga Nariyuki de Heroine ni Natta Kekka www 'Narihero www'	Sōta Sugahara	Bouncy
June 21	Lupin the Third: Jigen's Gravestone	Lupin the IIIrd: Jigen Daisuke no Bohyō	Takeshi Koike	Telecom Animation Film
March 1	The Big First-Grader and the Small Second-Grader	Ōkii Ichinensei to Chiisana Ninensei	Ayumu Watanabe	A-1 Pictures
March 1	Parol's Future Island	Paroru no Miraijima	Kazuaki Imai	Shin-Ei Animation
March 1	Black Nest -Chronus-	Kuro no Sumika -Chronus-	Naoyuki Onda	Studio 4°C
October 25	Santa Company	Santa Company	Kenji Itoso	KENJI STUDIO, Nexus
August 30	Spochan Battle -for the future-	Spo-chan Taiketsu: Youkai Daikessen	Hiroshi Kubo	Wao World
July 5	Go! Anpanman: Apple Boy and the Wishes For Everyone	Soreike! Anpanman: Ringo Bōya to Minna no Negai	Jun Kawagoe	TMS/3xCube
August 9	Space Brothers #0	Uchū Kyōdai #0	Ayumu Watanabe	A-1 Pictures
December 6	Space Battleship Yamato 2199: Odyssey of the Celestial Ark	Uchū Senkan Yamato 2199: Hoshi-Meguru Hakobune	Makoto Bessho, Yutaka Izubuchi	Xebec
October 11	Space Battleship Yamato 2199: A Voyage to Remember	Uchū Senkan Yamato 2199: Tsuioku No Koukai	Takao Kato	AIC; Xebec
May 31	Yūto-kun ga Iku	Yūto-kun ga Iku	Ryo Higuchi	Shirogumi
September 19	Yowamushi Pedal Re:RIDE	Yowamushi Pedal Re:RIDE	Osamu Nabeshima	TMS/8PAN
April 4	Eagle Talon 7: Her Majesty's Joboob	Taka no Tsume 7 - Joō Heika no Joboob	FROGMAN	Kaeruotoko Shokai
February 8	Buddha 2: The Endless Journey	Buddha 2: Tezuka Osamu no Budda - Owarinaki tabi	Toshiaki Komura	Toei Animation, Tezuka Production
February 8	Tiger & Bunny: The Rising	Tiger and Bunny	Yoshitomo Yonetani	Sunrise
February 22	Bodacious Space Pirates: Abyss of Hyperspace	Mōretsu Pirates: Akuu no Shin'en	Tatsuo Satō	Satelight
February 2	Giovanni's Island	Giovanni no Shima	Mizuho Nishikubo	Production I.G
March 8	Doraemon: New Nobita's Great Demon—Peko and the Exploration Party of Five	Eiga Doraemon Shin Nobita no Daimakyo ~Peko to 5-nin no Tankentai~	Shinnosuke Yakuwa	Shin-Ei Animation
March 8	Pretty Rhythm All Stars Selection Prism Show☆Best Ten Movie	Gekijō-ban Pretty Rhythm All Stars Selection Prism Show☆Best Ten	Masakazu Hishida	Tatsunoko Production
March 15	Pretty Cure All Stars New Stage 3: Eternal Friends	Purikyua All Stars New Stage 3: Eien no Tomodachi	Kouji Ogawa	Toei Animation
March 15	Sekai-ichi Hatsukoi: The Case of Takafumi Yokozawa	Sekai-ichi Hatsukoi: Yokozawa Takafumi no Baai	Chiaki Kon	Studio Deen
April 19	Detective Conan: Dimensional Sniper	Meitantei Konan: Ijigen no Sunaipā	Kobun Shizuno	TMS Entertainment
April 26	Heaven's Lost Property Final: Eternal My Master	Sora no Otoshimono Final: Eternal My Master	Hisashi Saito	Production IMS
April 26	Tamako Love Story	Tamako no Love Story	Naoko Yamada	Kyoto Animation
June 7	Persona 3 The Movie: Chapter 2, Midsummer Knight's Dream	Gekijōban Persona 3 Dai Ni Shō	Tomohisa Taguchi	A-1 Pictures
June 21	Saint Seiya: Legend of Sanctuary	Saint Seiya Legend of Sanctuary	Keiichi Sato	Toei Animation
July 12	K: Missing Kings	K MISSING KINGS	Shingo Suzuki	GoHands
July 19	Pokémon the Movie: Diancie and the Cocoon of Destruction	Pokémon The Movie XY "Hakai no Mayu to Dianshī"	Kunihiko Yuyama	OLM
July 19	When Marnie Was There	Omoide no Marnie	Hiromasa Yonebayashi	Studio Ghibli
August 8	Stand by Me Doraemon	Stand by Me Doraemon	Ryūichi Yagi, Takashi Yamazaki	Shin-Ei Animation, Shirogumi, Robot
August 23	New Theatrical Movie Initial D Legend 1: Awakening	Shin Gekijō-ban Initial D Legend 1 -Kakusei-	Masamitsu Hidaka	Sanzigen, Liden Films
November 11	Expelled From Paradise	Rakuen Tsuihō - Expelled from Paradise	Seiji Mizushima	Toei Animation; Graphinica
December 6	The Last: Naruto the Movie	The Last Naruto the Movie	Tsuneo Kobayashi	Pierrot
December 13	Aikatsu! the Movie	Aikatsu!	Yuichiro Yano	Sunrise

=== Television series ===
A list of anime television series released between 1 January and 31 December 2014.

Release date	English title	Japanese title	Director	Studio
April 6	Rowdy Sumo Wrestler Matsutaro!!	Abarenbō Rikishi!! Matsutarō	Yukio Kaizawa	Toei Animation
October 6	Ai Tenchi Muyo!	Ai tenchimuyō!	Hiroshi Negishi	AIC Plus+
July 8	Ai Mai Mi: Mousou Catastrophe	Choboraunyopomi Gekijō Dainimaku Ai Mai Mi: Mōsō Catastrophe	Itsuki Imazaki	Seven
October 2	Aikatsu!		Ryuichi Kimura	Sunrise
April 10	Atelier Escha & Logy: Alchemists of the Dusk Sky	Escha & Logy no Atelier: Tasogare no Sora no Renkinjutsushi	Yoshiaki Iwasaki	Studio Gokumi
July 19	Baby Gamba	Bebī ganba	Tomohiro Kawamura	Shirogumi Inc.
July 6	Barakamon	Barakamon	Masaki Tachibana	Kinema Citrus
January 4	BeyWarriors: BeyRaiderz		Katsumi Hasegawa	Nelvana, SynergySP, d-rights
October 18	BeyWarriors: Cyborg	Beiu~ōriāzu saibōgu	Kunihisa Sugishima	Nelvana, SynergySP, d-rights
July 10	Black Butler: Book of Circus	Kuroshitsuji: Book of Circus	Noriyuki Abe	A-1 Pictures
April 3	Blade & Soul	Bureido ando souru	Hiroshi Takeuchi, Hiroshi Hamasaki	Gonzo
July 14	Blade Dance of the Elementalers	Seirei Tsukai no Bureidodansu	Tetsuya Yanagisawa	TNK
July 7	Blue Spring Ride	Ao Haru Ride	Ai Yoshimura	Production I.G
October 10	BONJOUR Sweet Love Patisserie	Bonjour Koiaji Pâtisserie	Noriaki Akitaya	Silver Link, Connect
June 6	Bottom Biting Bug	Oshiri Kajiri Mushi	Kaori, Masatsugu Arakawa	Kinema Citrus
April 6	Broken Blade	Break Blade	Nobuyoshi Habara	Production I.G, Xebec
June 7	Calimero			Gaumont Animation
October 26	Cardfight!! Vanguard G	Kādofaito!! Vangādo G	Yui Umemoto	TMS Entertainment, Sotsu, Dentsu
March 9	Cardfight!! Vanguard: Legion Mate	Kādofaito!! Vangādo Region Meito Hen	Hatsuki Tsuji	TMS/Double Eagle
April 2	Carino Coni	Karīno koni	Yuuichi Abe	Robot
April 5	La Corda d'Oro Blue Sky	Kin-iro no Corda Blue♪Sky	Kōjin Ochi	TYO Animations
October 5	CROSS ANGE Rondo of Angel and Dragon	CROSS ANGE Tenshi to Ryū no Rondo	Yoshiharu Ashino	Sunrise
April 6	Dragon Ball Z Kai: The Final Chapters	Dragon Ball Kai	Yasuhiro Nowatari	Toei Animation
April 7	Dragon Collection	Doragon Korekushon	Keiichiro Kawaguchi	OLM
July 6	Dramatical Murder	Doramatikaru Mādā	Kazuya Miura	NAZ
April 5	Duel Masters VS	Dyueru masutāzu VS	Shinobu Sasaki	Ascension
July 10	Fate/kaleid liner Prisma Illya 2wei!	Fate/kaleid rainā purizuma ☆ Iriya Tsuvu~Ai!	Shin Ōnuma, Masato Jinbo	Silver Link
April 5	The File of Young Kindaichi Returns	Kindaichi Shōnen no Jikenbo Returns	Yutaka Tsuchida	Toei Animation
July 6	Francesca: Girls Be Ambitious	Francesca	Hitoshi Kumagai, Yuichiro Yano	Telecom Animation Film
July 2	Free! Eternal Summer		Hiroko Utsumi	Kyoto Animation, Animation Do
October 5	The Fruit of Grisaia	Grisaia no Kajitsu	Tensho	8-Bit
September 26	Ganbare! Lulu Lolo - Tiny Twin Bears		Yūji Umoto	Fanworks
April 1	Gigant Shooter Tsukasa	Chō-Bakuretsu I-Jigen Menko Battle Gigant Shooter Tsukasa	Ryōichi Mori	Fanworks, Forest Hunting One
July 3	Glasslip	Gurasurippu	Junji Nishimura	P.A. Works
April 3	Go-Go Tamagotchi!	GO GO Tamagotchi!	Jouji Shimura	OLM
October 20	GraP & RodeO	Gura P & rodeotto	Taketo Shinkai	Pie in the Sky
October 8	Gundam Build Fighters Try	Gandamu Birudo Faitāzu Torai	Shinya Watada	Sunrise
October 2	Gundam Reconguista in G	Gandamu G no Rekongisuta	Yoshiyuki Tomino	Sunrise
April 7	Hero Bank	Hīrō Banku	Yasutaka Yamamoto	TMS Entertainment
October 8	Hi-sCool! Seha Girls	Hai Sukūru SeHa Gāru	Sōta Sugawara	TMS Entertainment
July 7	Secret Princess Himegoto	Jinsei Sōdan Terebi Animēshon "Jinsei"	Yūji Yanase	Asahi Production
April	Secret Society Eagle Talon Extreme	Himitsu Kessha Taka no Tsume EX	FROGMAN	DLE
October 3	I Can't Understand What My Husband Is Saying	Danna ga Nani o Itteiru ka Wakaranai Ken	Shinpei Nagai	Seven
May 16	Initial D: Final Stage	Kashiramoji [ Initial ] D Final Stage	Mitsuo Hashimoto	SynergySP
April 3	Insufficient Direction	Kantoku Fuyuki Todoki	Azuma Tani	DLE
July 11	Invaders of the Rokujyōma!?	Rokujyōma no Shinryakusha!?	Shin Ōnuma	Silver Link
July 6	Jinsei - Life Consulting		Keiichiro Kawaguchi	Feel
March 22	Keroro	Keroro Gunsō	Haruki Kasugamori	Sunrise, Gathering
October 6	Konna Watashi-tachi ga Nariyuki de Heroine ni Natta Kekka www 'Narihero www'		Sōta Sugahara	Bouncy
April 2	KutsuDaru.	Kutsu daru	Taka Katou	Studio Egg
April 5	Lady Jewelpet	Redi Juerupetto	Itsuro Kawasaki	Zexcs, Studio Gallop
July 4	Locodol	Futsū no Joshikōsei ga Locodol Yattemita	Munenori Nawa	Feel
April 21	M3: The Dark Metal	M3 - Sono Kuroki Hagane	Junichi Sato	Satelight, C2C
April 27	Lovely Movie: Lovely Muuuuuuuco! Season 2	Lovely Movie: Itoshi no Muco Season 2	Takenori Mihara	Doga Kobo
October 4	Magic Kaito 1412	Majikku Kaito 1412	Susumu Kudo	A-1 Pictures
July 9	Magimoji Rurumo	Majimoji Rurumo	Chikara Sakurai	J.C.Staff
July 6	Always! Super Radical Gag Family	Maido! Urayasu Tekkin Kazoku	Akitaro Daichi	Studio Deen
April 1	Majin Bone		Kōnosuke Uda	Toei Animation
April 2	Marvel Disk Wars: The Avengers	Disuku Wōzu: Abenjāzu	Toshiaki Komura	Toei Animation
August 5	Medamayaki no Kimi Itsu Tsubusu?		Lareko	Fanworks
January 9	Me Itantei Rasukaru		Shudō Jun	
April 6	Meshimase Lodoss-tō Senki Sorette Oishii no?	Meshimase Rōdosu Senki: Sorette Oishii no?	Iku Suzuki	Studio Deen, Studio Hibari
July 14	Minarai Diva		Kōtarō Ishidate	Bouncy
July 6	Mobile Suit Gundam-san	Kidō Senshi Gandamu-san	Mankyū	Sunrise
July 8	Momo Kyun Sword	Momo Kyun Sōdo	Shinsuke Yanagi	Tri-Slash, Project No. 9
July 7	Monthly Girls' Nozaki-kun	Gekkan Shōjo Nozaki-kun	Mitsue Yamazaki	Doga Kobo
October 6	Mysterious Joker	Kaitō Joker	Yukiyo Teramoto	Shin-Ei Animation
March 10	Nandaka Velonica		Michiya Katou	Cyclone Graphics
April 26	Neko no Dayan		Hazumu Sakuta	Kachidoki Studio
April 1	Ninjaboy Rintaro	Nintama Rantaro	Tsutomu Shibayama	Ajia-do
July	Nyanpuku Nyaruma		Takeshi Onaka	Kachidoki Studio
July 12	Nobunaga Concerto	Nobunaga Kontseruto	Yūsuke Fujikawa	
May 3	Ohenro	Ohenro: Hachi Hachi Aruki	Masato Nagamori	ufotable
April 7	Oreca Battle		Tetsurō Amino	OLM, Xebec
October 6	Orenchi no Furo Jijō		Sayo Aoi	Asahi Production
July 11	Persona 4: The Golden Animation		Seiji Kishi, Tomohisa Taguchi	A-1 Pictures
April 5	Pretty Rhythm All Star Selection		Masakazu Hishida	Tatsunoko Production
July 5	PriPara (Prism Paradise)		Makoto Moriwaki	Tatsunoko Production, DongWoo A&E
July 4	Rail Wars!	Rail Wars! -Nippon Kuni Yū Tetsudō Kōantai	Yoshifumi Matsuda	Passione
July 8	Re:␣Hamatora		Seiji Kishi	Lerche
July 2	Samurai Jam -Bakumatsu Rock-		Itsuro Kawasaki	Studio Deen
October 4	Selector Spread Wixoss	Wikurosu	Takuya Satō	J.C.Staff
July 6	Sengoku Basara: End of Judgement	Sengoku Basara Judge End	Takashi Sano	TMS Entertainment
July 5	Shōnen Hollywood - Holly Stage for 49		Toshimasa Kuroyanagi	Zexcs
January 9	Silver Spoon Season 2	Gin no Saji Dai-2-ki	Tomohiko Itō, Kotomi Deai	A-1 Pictures
July 3	Sin Strange Plus		Hiroyuki Furukawa	Seven
July 11	Tokyo ESP	Tōkyō Īesupī	Shigehito Takayanagi	Xebec
July 4	Tokyo Ghoul	Tōkyō Gūru	Shuhei Morita	Pierrot
September 28	Tribe Cool Crew	Toraibu KuruKuru	Masaya Fujimori	Sunrise, BN Pictures
December 31	Tsukimonogatari		Akiyuki Shinbo, Tomoyuki Itamura	Shaft
March 10	Wasimo		Yasuhiro Imagawa	Studio Deen
October 6	When Supernatural Battles Became Commonplace	Inō-Batoru wa Nichijō-kei no Naka de	Masahiko Otsuka, Masanori Takahashi	Trigger
April 17	World Fool News			CoMix Wave Films
October 5	World Trigger	Wārudo Torigā	Mitsuru Hongo, Kouji Ogawa	Toei Animation
October 6	Yowamushi Pedal Grande Road	Yowamushi pedaru GRANDE ROAD	Osamu Nabeshima	TMS Entertainment, 8PAN
July 6	Yamishibai: Japanese Ghost Stories		Noboru Iguchi, Shoichiro Masumoto, Takashi Shimizu	ILCA
January 4	Future Card Buddyfight	Fyūchā Kādo Badifaito	Shigetaka Ikeda	OLM
January 4	Recently, My Sister is Unusual	Saikin, Imōto no Yōsu ga Chotto Okashiin Da Ga	Hiroyuki Hata	Project No. 9
January 4	Seitokai Yakuindomo		Hiromitsu Kanazawa	GoHands
January 4	Space Dandy	Supēsu Dandi	Shinichirō Watanabe, Shingo Natsume	Bones
January 5	Buddy Complex	Badi Konpurekkusu	Yasuhiro Tanabe	Sunrise
January 5	Everyone Assemble! Falcom Academy	Minna Atsumare! Falcom Gakuen	Pippuya	Dax Production
January 5	Nobunaga the Fool	Nobunaga za Fūru	Hidekazu Sato	Satelight
January 5	Nobunagun	Nobunagan	Nobuhiro Kondo	Bridge
January 5	Noragami	Noragami	Kotaro Tamura	Bones
January 5	Saki: The Nationals	Saki: Zenkoku-hen	Manabu Ono	Studio Gokumi
January 5	My Neighbor Seki: The Master of Killing Time	Tonari no Seki-kun	Yūji Mutoh	Shin-Ei Animation
January 5	Witch Craft Works	Witchikurafuto Wākusu	Tsutomu Mizushima	J.C.Staff
January 6	D-Frag!	Dīfuragu!	Seiki Sugawara, Shizutaka Sugahara	Brain's Base
January 6	The Pilot's Love Song	Toaru Hikūshi e no Koiuta	Toshimasa Suzuki	TMS Entertainment, 3xCube
January 6	Robot Girls Z	Robotto Gāruzu Zetto	Hiroshi Ikehata	Toei Animation
January 6	SoniAni: Super Sonico The Animation		Kenichi Kawamura	White Fox
January 7	Hamatora: The Animation		Hiroshi Kimura	NAZ
January 7	Wooser's Hand-to-Mouth Life: Awakening Arc	Wooser no Sono Higurashi Kakusei-hen	Kenji Seto	Sanzigen, Liden Films
January 7	The Love Of New Wings	Atarashī tsubasa no ai	Toshiaki Komura	Sunrise
January 8	Love, Chunibyo & Other Delusions!: Heart Throb	Chūnibyō demo Koi ga Shitai! Ren	Tatsuya Ishihara	Kyoto Animation
January 8	Engaged to the Unidentified	Mikakunin de Shinkōkei	Yoshiyuki Fujiwara	Doga Kobo
January 8	Yōkai Watch	Yōkai Wotchi	Shinji Ushiro	OLM
January 8	Hozuki's Coolheadedness	Hōzuki no Reitetsu	Hiro Kaburaki	Wit Studio
January 9	Magical Warfare	Mahō Sensō	Yuzo Sato	Madhouse
January 9	Onee-chan ga Kita	Onēchan ga Kita	Yoshihide Yuuzumi	C2C
January 9	Pupa	Pyūpa	Tomomi Mochizuki	Studio Deen
January 9	Sakura Trick	Sakura Torikku	Ken'ichi Ishikura	Studio Deen
January 9	Strange+		Takashi Nishikawa	Seven
January 9	Z/X Ignition		Yūji Yamaguchi	Telecom Animation Film
January 10	Go! Go! 575	Go! Go! Goshichigo	Takebumi Anzai	C2C, Lay-duce
January 10	Wake Up, Girls!		Yutaka Yamamoto	Ordet, Tatsunoko Production
January 10	No-Rin	Nōrin	Shin Ōnuma	Silver Link
January 11	Nisekoi: False Love	Nisekoi	Naoyuki Tatsuwa, Akiyuki Shinbo	Shaft
January 11	World Conquest Zvezda Plot	Sekai Seifuku - Bōryaku no Zvezda	Tensai Okamura	A-1 Pictures
January 12	Tesagure! Bukatsu-mono Encore	Te sagure! Bukatsu mo no anko ̄ru	Kōtarō Ishidate	Yaoyorozu
January 12	Wizard Barristers	Wizard Barristers - Benmashi Seshiru	Yasuomi Umetsu	Arms Corporation
January 14	Sugar Soldier	Shugā Sorujā		
January 15	Inari Kon Kon	Inari, Konkon, Koi Iroha	Toru Takahashi	Production IMS
January 15	Maken-Ki! Two		Hiraku Kaneko	Xebec
February 2	HappinessCharge PreCure!	HapinesuChāji PuriKyua!	Tatsuya Nagamine	Toei Animation
February 4	Romantica Clock	Romanchika Kurokku		
April 3	The Kawai Complex Guide to Manors and Hostel Behavior	Bokura wa Minna Kawai-sō	Shigeyuki Miya	Brain's Base
April 3	Riddle Story of Devil	Akuma no Riddle	Keizō Kusakawa	Diomedéa
April 3	Selector Infected WIXOSS		Takuya Satō	J.C.Staff
April 4	JoJo's Bizarre Adventure: Stardust Crusaders	JoJo no Kimyō na Bōken: Stardust Crusaders	Naokatsu Tsuda, Ken'ichi Suzuki	David Production
April 4	Mushishi: The Next Chapter	Mushishi: Zoku-Shō	Hiroshi Nagahama	Artland
April 5	Dragonar Academy	Seikoku no Doragunā	Shunsuke Tada, Tomoyuki Kurokawa	C-Station
April 5	Captain Earth	Kyaputen Āsu	Takuya Igarashi	Bones
April 5	Fairy Tail (2014)		Shinji Ishihira	A-1 Pictures, Bridge
April 5	The Irregular at Magic High School	Mahōka Kōkō no Rettōsei	Manabu Ono	Madhouse
April 5	Daimidaler: Prince vs Penguin Empire	Kenzen Robo Daimidarā	Tetsuya Yanagisawa	TNK
April 5	Kamigami no Asobi: Ludere deorum		Tomoyuki Kawamura	Brain's Base
April 6	Baby Steps	Beibī Suteppu	Masahiko Murata	Pierrot
April 6	Brynhildr in the Darkness	Gokukoku no Buryunhirude	Kenichi Imaizumi	Arms Corporation
April 6	Haikyū!!	Haikyū!!	Susumu Mitsunaka	Production I.G
April 6	If Her Flag Breaks	Kanojo ga Flag o Oraretara (Gaworare)	Ayumu Watanabe	Hoods Entertainment
April 6	Love Live! School Idol Project 2	Love Live! School Idol Project 2-ki	Takahiko Kyōgoku	Sunrise
April 6	The World Is Still Beautiful	Soredemo Sekai wa Utsukushii	Hajime Kamegaki	Pierrot
April 6	Yu-Gi-Oh! Arc-V	Yūgiō Āku Faibu	Katsumi Ono	Studio Gallop
April 7	One Week Friends	Isshūkan Friends	Tarou Iwasaki	Brain's Base
April 7	The Comic Artist and His Assistants	Mangaka-san to Ashisutanto-san to (ManAshi)	Takeshi Furuta	Zexcs
April 8	Soul Eater Not!	Sōru Ītā Notto!	Masakazu Hashimoto	Bones
April 8	Black Bullet	Burakku Buretto	Masayuki Kojima	Kinema Citrus, Orange
April 8	Magica Wars	Mahō Shōjo Taisen	Ayano Ohnoki	Gainax
April 9	Dai-Shogun: Great Revolution	Fūun Ishin Dai Shogun	Takashi Watanabe	J.C.Staff, A.C.G.T
April 9	No Game No Life		Atsuko Ishizuka	Madhouse
April 9	Chaika - The Coffin Princess	Hitsugi no Chaika	Sōichi Masui	Bones
April 10	Is the Order a Rabbit?	Gochūmon wa Usagi Desu ka? (GochiUsa)	Hiroyuki Hashimoto	White Fox
April 10	Inugami-san to Nekoyama-san		Shinpei Nagai	Seven
April 10	Nanana's Buried Treasure	Ryūgajō Nanana no Maizōkin	Kanta Kamei	A-1 Pictures
April 11	Ping Pong the Animation		Masaaki Yuasa	Tatsunoko Production
April 11	Knights of Sidonia	Sidonia no Kishi	Kobun Shizuno	Polygon Pictures
April 12	Date A Live II		Keitaro Motonaga	Production IMS
April 12	Mekakucity Actors	Mekakushiti Akutāzu	Akiyuki Shinbo, Yuki Yase	Shaft
July 3	Argevollen	Shirogane no Ishi Arujevorun	Atsushi Ōtsuki	Xebec
July 5	Sword Art Online II	Sword Art Online II	Tomohiko Itō	A-1 Pictures
July 6	Aldnoah.Zero	Arudonoa Zero	Ei Aoki	A-1 Pictures, TROYCA
July 6	Sabagebu! -Survival Game Club!-		Masahiko Ohta	Pierrot+
July 7	Akame ga Kill!	Akame ga Kiru!	Tomoki Kobayashi	White Fox
July 8	Hanayamata		Atsuko Ishizuka	Madhouse
July 9	Encouragement of Climb 2	Yama no Susume Second Season	Yusuke Yamamoto	8-Bit
July 9	Love Stage!!	Rabu Sutēji	Ken'ichi Kasai	J.C.Staff
July 10	Terror in Resonance	Zankyō no Terror	Shinichirō Watanabe	MAPPA
September 27	Terra Formars	Tera Fōmāzu	Hiroshi Hamasaki	Liden Films
October 2	Denki-Gai	Denkigai no Honya-san	Masafumi Sato	Shin-Ei Animation
October 4	Lord Marksman and Vanadis	Madan no Ō to Vanadis	Tatsuo Satō	Satelight
October 4	In Search of the Lost Future	Ushinawareta Mirai o Motomete (Waremete)	Naoto Hosoda	Feel
October 4	Laughing Under the Clouds	Donten ni Warau	Hiroshi Haraguchi	Doga Kobo
October 4	Garo the Animation	Garo -Honō no Kokuin-	Yuichiro Hayashi	MAPPA
October 4	Log Horizon 2		Shinji Ishihira	Studio Deen
October 4	Fate/stay night: Unlimited Blade Works		Takahiro Miura	ufotable
October 5	Celestial Method	Sora no Method	Masayuki Sakoi	3Hz
October 5	Wolf Girl & Black Prince	Ōkami Shōjo to Kuro Ōji	Kenichi Kasai	TYO Animations
October 5	The Seven Deadly Sins	Nanatsu no Taizai	Tensai Okamura	A-1 Pictures
October 6	Gugure! Kokkuri-san		Yoshimasa Hiraike	TMS Entertainment
October 6	Rage of Bahamut: Genesis	Shingeki no Bahamut Genesis	Keiichi Sato	MAPPA
October 7	Amagi Brilliant Park	Amagi Buririanto Pāku	Yasuhiro Takemoto	Kyoto Animation
October 7	Yona of the Dawn	Akatsuki no Yona	Kazuhiro Yoneda	Pierrot
October 8	Trinity Seven	Toriniti Sebun: Shichi-nin no Masho Tsukai	Hiroshi Nishikiori	Seven Arcs
October 8	Parasyte ~The Maxim~	Kiseijū: Sei no Kakuritsu	Kenichi Shimizu	Madhouse
October 9	A Good Librarian Like a Good Shepherd	Daitoshokan no Hitsujikai	Asami Sodeyama, Kaori Hayashi, Kenichi Konishi, Tomomi Kamiya, Yuu Nobuta	Hoods Entertainment
October 9	Shirobako		Tsutomu Mizushima	P.A. Works
October 10	Psycho-Pass 2		Naoyoshi Shiotani, Kiyotaka Suzuki	Production I.G.
October 10	Your Lie in April	Shigatsu wa Kimi no Uso (KimiUso)	Kyōhei Ishiguro	A-1 Pictures
October 10	Gonna be the Twin-Tail!!	Ore, Twintail ni Narimasu. (OreTsui)	Hiroyuki Kanbe	Production IMS
October 11	Ronja the Robber's Daughter	Sanzoku no Musume Ronja	Gorō Miyazaki	Polygon Pictures, Studio Ghibli
October 13	Girl Friend BETA	Girl Friend (kari)	Naotaka Hayashi	Silver Link
October 17	Yuki Yuna Is a Hero	Yūki Yūna wa Yūsha de Aru	Seiji Kishi	Studio Gokumi
August 16	Hanamonogatari		Akiyuki Shinbo, Tomoyuki Itamura	Shaft

=== OVAs & Specials ===
A list of original video animations (OVAs), original net animations (ONAs), original animation DVDs (OADs), and specials released between 1 January and 31 December 2014. Titles listed are named after their series if their associated OVA, special, etc. was not named separately.

Release date	English title	Japanese title	Type	Director	Studio
November 17	Ace of Diamond	Daiya no Ace	OVA	Takayuki Hamana	Madhouse, Production I.G
April 3	Age 12	12-Sai.	OVA	Masaki Ōzora	SynergySP
October 17	Alice in Borderland	Imawa no Kuni no Alice	OVA	Hideki Tachibana	CONNECT, Silver Link
April 18	Sister's Log - Moyako's Monologue That Won't Stop	Ane Log - Moyako Nee-san no Tomaranai Monologue	OVA	Tetsuo Ichimura	Brain's Base
December 9	Attack on Titan: No Regrets	Shingeki no Kyojin: Kuinaki Sentaku	OVA	Tetsuo Araki	Wit Studio
October 25	Black Butler: Book of Murder	Kuroshitsuji: Book of Murder	OVA	Noriyuki Abe	A-1 Pictures
December 19	Brothers Conflict	Brothers Conflict	OVA	Jun Matsumoto	Brain's Base
September 6	Chain Chronicle	Chain Chronicle	OVA	Takeshi Mori	Jūmonji
November	Hyperdimension Robo Meguru	Chōjikū Robo Meguru	OVA	Keiji Gotoh	Brain's Base, Studio A-Cat
August 2	Elite Jack!!	Elite Jack!!	OVA	Osamu Sekita	Wish
September 18	Fantasista Stella	Fantasista Stella	OVA	Hideya Takahashi	Xebec
October 29	Fastening Days	Fastening Days	ONA	Hiroyasu Ishida	Studio Colorido
March 10	Fate/kaleid liner Prisma Illya	Fate/kaleid liner Prisma ☆ Illya	OVA	Hiroshi Hiroyama	Silver Link
October 10	Futari H - The One And Only Step Up Love Story	Futari Ecchi	OVA	Tetsurō Amino	Production Reed
April 24	School of Monsters	Gakumon! ~Ōkami Shōjo wa Kujikenai~	ONA	Kenshirō Morii	Studio Moriken
July 25	Girls und Panzer: This Is the Real Anzio Battle!	Girls und Panzer: Kore ga Hontō no Anzio-sen Desu!	OVA	Tsutomu Mizushima	Actas
May 5	GJ Club@	GJ-bu@	Special	Yoshiyuki Fujiwara	Doga Kobo
June 16	Hayate the Combat Butler!	Hayate no Gotoku!	OVA	Yōichi Ueda	Manglobe
December 6	Hozuki's Coolheadedness	Hōzuki no Reitetsu	OVA	Hiro Kaburagi	Wit Studio
October 29	Hybrid Child	Hybrid Child	OVA	Michio Fukuda	Studio Deen
December 21	Ikki Tousen: Extravaganza Epoch	Ikki Tousen: Extravaganza Epoch	OVA	Masashi Kudō	Arms
July 3	Inui-san!	Inui-san!	OVA	Yūtarō Sawada	Pie in the Sky
November 7	Japan Animator Expo	Nihon Animētā Mihon'ichi	ONA	Various	Various
November 28	Jūza Engi Engetsu Sangokuden	Jūza Engi Engetsu Sangokuden: Gaiden Kasokeshū Maboroshi Yoru	OVA	Naoyuki Kuzuya	Anpro, teamKG
September 3	Housekeeper Ita	Kaseifu ga Ita	OVA	Taketo Shinkai	Pie in the Sky
January 17	A Town Where You Live	Kimi no Iru Machi	OVA	Shigeyasu Yamauchi^{[?]}	GONZO
November 11	Love Stage!!	Love Stage!!	OVA	Ken'ichi Kasai	J.C.Staff
May 16	Magi: Adventure of Sinbad	Magi: Sinbad no Bōken	OVA	Yoshikazu Miyao	Lay-duce
December 26	The Disappearance of Conan Edogawa: The Worst Two Days in History	Meitantei Conan: Edogawa Conan Shissō Jiken -Chijō Saiaku no Futsukakan-	Special	Yasuichiro Yamamoto	TMS Entertainment
March 12	Mitsuwano	Mitsuwano	OVA	Takashi Igari	ZEXCS
July 18	Mushibugyo	Mushibugyō	OVA	Takayuki Hamana	Seven Arcs Pictures
January 1	Mushishi Special: Sun-Eating Shade	Mushishi Tokubetsu-hen: Hihamukage	Special	Hiroshi Nagahama	Artland
August 20	Mushi-Shi -Next Passage- Special: Path of Thorns	Mushishi Zoku-Shō Tokubetsu-hen: Odoro no Michi	Special	Hiroshi Nagahama	Artland
February 5	Natsume's Book of Friends: Sometime on a Sunny Day	Natsume Yūjin-Chō: Itsuka Yuki no Hi ni	OVA	Takahiro Ōmori	Brain's Base
February 5	Natsume's Book of Friends: Nyanko-sensei & The First Errand	Natsume Yūjin-Chō: Nyanko-sensei to Hajimete no Otsukai	OVA	Takahiro Ōmori	Brain's Base
October 3	Nisekoi	Nisekoi	OVA	Akiyuki Simbo, Naoyuki Tatsuwa	Shaft
July 23	Non Non Biyori	Non Non Biyori	OVA	Shinya Kawatsura	Silver Link
August 30	One Piece 3D2Y: Overcome Ace's Death! Luffy's Vow to his Friends	One Piece "3D2Y" Ace no Shi wo Koete! Luffy Nakama to no Chikai	Special	Naoyuki Itou	Toei Animation
August 29	Paradise of Innocence	Mujaki no Rakuen	OVA	Hideki Araki, Takashi Nishikawa	Seven
March 21	Paulette's Chair	Paulette no Isu	Special	Hiroyasu Ishida	Studio Colorido
April 3	Pokémon: Mega Evolution Special I	Pocket Monsters XY Tokubetsu Hen: Saikyō Mega Shinka Act I	Special	Kunihiko Yuyama	OLM
November 6	Pokémon: Mega Evolution Special II	Pocket Monsters XY Tokubetsu Hen: Saikyō Mega Shinka Act II	Special	Kunihiko Yuyama	OLM
October 28	The Prince of Tennis II OVA vs. Genius 10	Shin Tennis no Ōji-sama OVA vs. Genius 10	OVA	Hideyo Yamamoto	M.S.C, Production I.G
January 22	Sunday Without God	Kami-sama no Inai Nichiyōbi	OVA	Yūji Kumazawa	Madhouse
January 29	Little Busters! EX	Little Busters! EX	OVA	Yoshinobu Yamakawa	J.C.Staff
February 17	Noragami: Stray God	Noragami	OAD	Kotaro Tamura	Bones
February 26	Extinct Device Girl: Amazing Twins	Zetsumetsu Kigu Shōjo Amazing Twins	OVA	Junichi Sato	Encourage Films
July 5	Sailor Moon Crystal	Bishōjo Senshi Sailer Moon Crystal	ONA	Munehisa Sakai	Toei Animation
August 19	Terra Formars	Terra Formars	OVA	Hiroshi Hamasaki	Liden Films
October 22	No Matter How I Look at It, It's You Guys' Fault I'm Not Popular!	Watashi ga Motenai no wa Dō Kangaetemo Omaera ga Warui! (WataMote)	OVA	Shin Ōnuma	Silver Link
November 22	Riddle Story of Devil	Akuma no Riddle	OVA	Keizō Kusakawa	Diomedéa
November 26	Infinite Stratos 2: World Purge	< Infinite Stratos > 2 OVA Wārudo Pāji-hen	OVA	Yasuhito Kikuchi	8-Bit
December 30	Tales of Zestiria: Dawn of the Shepherd	Tales of Zestiria - Doushi no Yoake	Special	Haruo Sotozaki	ufotable

== Highest-grossing films ==
The top ten anime films of 2014 by worldwide gross are as follows:

Rank	English title	Gross	Ref.
1	Stand By Me Doraemon	$183,442,714	
2	Yo-Kai Watch: The Movie	+$59.19 million	
3	Detective Conan: Dimensional Sniper	$42,028,116	
4	Doraemon: New Nobita's Great Demon—Peko and the Exploration Party of Five	$35,861,856	
5	When Marnie Was There	$33,936,662	
6	Pokémon the Movie: Diancie and the Cocoon of Destruction	$26,732,338	
7	Crayon Shin-chan: Serious Battle! Robot Dad Strikes Back	$17,542,129	
8	Saint Seiya: Legend of Sanctuary	$11.45 million	
9	Pretty Cure All Stars New Stage 3: Eternal Friends	$8,526,335	
10	The Idolmaster Movie: Beyond the Brilliant Future!	$6,234,533	

== Deaths ==
=== January ===
- January 17 – Seizō Katō, 86, voice actor, bladder cancer.
- January 27
  - Masaaki Tsukada, 74, voice actor.
  - Ichirō Nagai, 82, voice actor, Coronary Artery Disease.

=== March ===
- March 8 – Runa Akiyama, 59, voice actress, heart failure.

=== May ===
- May 1 – Kōji Yada, 81, voice actor, kidney failure.

=== November ===
- November 1 – Kazuko Yanaga, 67, voice actress (Ace wo Nerae!, Armored Trooper Votoms), sepsis.
- November 17 – Rokurō Naya, 82, voice actor (Saint Seiya, Yu Yu Hakusho, Eureka Seven: AO).
- November 28 – Bunta Sugawara, 81, actor (Torakku Yarō, Spirited Away), liver cancer.

== See also ==
- 2014 in Japanese television (general)
- 2014 in Polish television
- 2014 in Russia
- 2014 in Serbia
- 2014 in Ukraine
- 2014 in television
- 2014 in animation
- 2014 in manga
