= List of Buddy Complex episodes =

Cover of the first Blu-ray volume released by Bandai Visual in Japan on March 26, 2014

Buddy Complex is a 2014 Japanese mecha anime series produced by Sunrise in collaboration with Bandai Visual, Bandai Channel, Lantis, Banpresto, and Bandai Namco Games under Bandai Namco Holdings.

The anime series is the original creation of Hajime Yatate and is directed by Yasuhiro Tanabe with series composition by BC project, original character designs and animation direction by Asako Inayoshi and Tomoshige Inayoshi, soundtrack music by Tatsuya Kato and 3D CG by Orange.

The series follows Aoba Watase, an ordinary high school boy who lived an average, everyday life commuting to high school in the city. On the first day back after summer break, Aoba is attacked by a giant robot that appears out of the sky. As he's pursued through the city, his classmate Hina Yumihara appears in a giant robot of her own. She rescues him, and tells him cryptically that "Dio is waiting," before she sends Aoba into the future and then disappears. When Aoba wakes up, he finds himself over seventy years into the future, where the Free Pact Alliance and the Zogilia Republic are at war with each other and there he meets young pilot named Dio Jyunyou Weinberg. This begins Aoba's new life as the pilot of the Free Pact Alliance and together with Dio, they would change the fate of the world.

The first part of the series aired 13 episodes between January 5, 2014, and March 30, 2014, every Sunday 24:00 JST on Tokyo MX with later airings on YTV, TVA, BS11 and Bandai Channel. The opening theme is "Unisonia" by True while the ending theme is "Ano Sora ni Kaeru Mirai de" by ChouCho. Funimation streamed the series on their video website, beginning on January 6, 2014. Daisuki streamed the episodes worldwide on their Website as well as on their official YouTube Channel. Bandai Visual will begin releasing the series in Japan on Blu-ray volumes starting on March 26, 2014.

A two-part sequel titled "Buddy Complex Final Chapter: In the Future When We Return to Those Skies" (バディ・コンプレックス 完結編 ―あの空に還る未来で―, Badi Konpurekkusu Kanketsu-hen: Ano Sora ni Kaeru Mirai de) aired on September 29 and 30, 2014. The insert song "Twin Bird" performed by True.

== Episode list ==
No.	Title	Written by	Original release date	Ref.
1	"Encounter"; Transliteration: "Deai" (Japanese: 出会い)	Tatsuhiko Urahata	January 5, 2014	
Aoba Watase is a normal Japanese first year high school student coming back to school after summer break when a mysterious robot from the future comes after him. He has never seen it before, but its pilot seems to know him and wants him dead. His classmate Hina Yumihara appears in a giant robot of her own. She rescues him and tells him to get inside the cockpit. She defeats the mysterious robot but after Hina explained what happens to Aoba, the mysterious robot wakes up then clings to Hina's mecha, the pilot initiates a self destruction and tells Hina that she's going to die together with Aoba Watase and him. Meanwhile, a time vortex appears in the sky, Hina decides to bring them into the time vortex. Inside the time vortex she tells Aoba cryptically "You're going to the future now, Dio is waiting," before she disappears. When Aoba wakes up, he finds himself in a strange cockpit alone, thrust into the middle of a furious firefight.
2	"Nice Coupling"; Transliteration: "Naisu Kappuringu" (Japanese: ナイスカップリング)	Tatsuhiko Urahata, Yuichi Nomura	January 12, 2014	
Zogilian's Valiancer squad led by Bizon Gerafil attacking one of the Alliance's secret tactical laboratories to capture the new Valiancers in the Alliance's possession that's in fact Dio's Bradyon. While the battle takes place, Aoba awakens and finds himself in the Luxon's cockpit. The Luxon activates once he regains consciousness and the monitor of the cockpit shows "Nice Coupling" with Dio's Bradyon. The Alliance ship The Cygnus's Captain Gengo Kuramitsu who realizes they are in an unfavorable circumstance due to the attack and the death of one of their pilots decides to order Dio to conduct a coupling with Aoba after he finds that Aoba showed high compatibility with Dio's Bradyon despite not knowing Aoba's identity. Dio initiates the coupling with Aoba, even though Aoba is confused at first he then follows what Dio says and they successfully conduct coupling process and giving both Valiancers increased capabilities. Though Aoba himself is not an experienced pilot, because of the coupling system he benefits from the knowledge Dio shares with him to operate the Valiancer and engage in combat. Aoba successfully defeats one of the Zogilian pilots and causes them to retreat. As Aoba unsuccessfully attempts to open the cockpit of Luxon, he finds Hina's hairclip. Almost immediately afterwards, the cockpit opens and Aoba finds Dio pointing a gun at him. The Cygnus's crew then takes Aoba inside the Cygnus and interrogates him. Aoba is confused with the whole situation because he's really in the future, in the year of 2088 where the Free Pact Alliance and the Zogilia Republic are at war with each other but Dio says he never knew him or Hina and doesn't believe he came from the past different with what Hina said that Dio is waiting for him. Meanwhile, the Cygnus takes off from the secret laboratories base and Zogilian's squad led by Alfried Gallant is ready for another attack.
3	"Meeting Again"; Transliteration: "Saikai" (Japanese: 再会)	Tatsuhiko Urahata	January 19, 2014	
As Aoba tries to come to grips with this new world that he's found himself in, the ship he is on comes under attack again. And during this engagement, he unexpectedly comes across someone he knows. Aoba is surprised to see Hina as the pilot of Zogilia. When he tries to get through her, Hina who is confused because the enemy pilot knew her name shoots Aoba. Bizon comes to rescue her and Zogilian's squad retreat. Aoba's reckless actions to get through to Hina causes brain damages for Dio due to Force Decoupling also injures Lee Conrad in his Beryl Commander who takes Alfried's Nector laser that was aimed toward Aoba's Luxon.
4	"The Time for Resolve"; Transliteration: "Ketsudan Notoki" (Japanese: 決断の時)	Kurasumi Sunayama	January 26, 2014	
Aoba faces the consequences of his rash actions during combat when he saw Hina. Later, the Cygnus lands at Narashino and Aoba gets a chance to explore his hometown to see what has become of it in the last 70 years.
5	"Scars"; Transliteration: "Kizuato" (Japanese: 傷跡)	Noboru Kimura	February 2, 2014	
Aoba finds out more about Dio and his family. And later, Cygnus unexpectedly finds itself being mobilized against an invading Zogilian force.
6	"The Other Coupler"; Transliteration: "Mōhitori no Kappurā" (Japanese: もう一人のカップラー)	Yuichi Nomura	February 9, 2014	
After being mobilized, the Cygnus and the Coupling Valiancers are no longer a secret. In order to defend their existence against outraged politicians, a film crew arrives to make a promotional video to rally popular support together with a Coupler pilot, Fromm Vantarhei.
7	"Buddy"; Transliteration: "Badi" (Japanese: バディ)	Tatsuhiko Urahata	February 16, 2014	
As the Cygnus makes its way to the Hawaii Base, Zogilia's Protection Division catches up with them. And the three Coupler pilots must decide who will pair up with whom.
8	"Stormy Night"; Transliteration: "Arashi no Yoru" (Japanese: 嵐の夜)	Noboru Kimura	February 23, 2014	
Aoba finally gets some time to talk to Hina, but as they try to survive the night on the island they crash-landed on, he has a frustrating time trying to get through to her. Dio worries about Aoba and decides to search for him, while Bizon tries to find Hina.
9	"The Coupling System"; Transliteration: "Kappuringu Shisutemu" (Japanese: カップリングシステム)	Kurasumi Sunayama	March 2, 2014	
Discouraged by his encounter with Hina, Aoba mopes around, but Dio finds his sniveling, defeatist attitude unacceptable, especially once they come under attack yet again.
10	"Father and Child"; Transliteration: "Chichi to Ko" (Japanese: 父と子)	Yuichi Nomura	March 9, 2014	
Aoba, Dio, and Mayuka get to go on shore leave in Hawaii. And in the meantime, the Zogilian contingent plan their next operation to get their hands on the Alliance's Coupling Valiancers.
11	"The Truth"; Transliteration: "Shinjitsu" (Japanese: 真実)	Noboru Kimura	March 16, 2014	
The Zogilians infiltrate the Hawaii Base. While the crew of the Cygnus work to thwart them, Hina's father reveals a startling truth to her. Hina who is sad after the death of her father and confused about her real identity accidentally meets Aoba. He comforts her and invites her to join the Cygnus. But, then Bizon comes to take Hina back and reminds her about their missions. Still confused about herself, Hina follows Bizon's order and they successfully steal Luxon and Bradyon. Aoba who won't let anyone to hurt Hina in her current state decides to pursue Hina using the old Coupling Valiancers Skyknight and Firebrand together with Dio.
12	"The Bond Between Them"; Transliteration: "Futari no Kizuna" (Japanese: ふたりの絆)	Kurasumi Sunayama	March 23, 2014	
The crew of the Cygnus work through the fallout of losing the Luxon and the Bradyon, and of the flawed Coupling that Aoba and Dio conducted using the old Coupling Valiancers. Meanwhile, Dr. Hahn drugs Hina to become the pilot for his new Coupling Valiancer after he found out Hina's emphatic waveform is almost perfectly synced with the system. Bizon who knows Hina became the pilot for the Zogilia's Coupling Valiancer offers himself to be Hina's buddy despite he needs to use a forced method to sync with Hina and the System. Bizon and Hina transfer to Zogilian's Adminburo and they join the large-scale operation of Zogilian Military to destroy the Alliance's fleet.
13	"Acception"; Transliteration: "Akusepushon" (Japanese: アクセプション)	Tatsuhiko Urahata	March 30, 2014	
With over half their fleet gone and up against enemy Coupling Valiancers, the Cygnus is tasked with taking down the Gorgon, Zogilia's weapon of mass destruction. Aoba and Dio, after receiving their new Valiancers Luxon NEXT and Bradyon NEXT, come to rescue the Cygnus from the attack of Zogilian's Coupling Valiancers piloted by Hina and Bizon. As Aoba realizes one of the pilots is Hina, he tries to get through to her.
Final (Part 1)	"Into the Skies of Tomorrow – First Half"; Transliteration: "Ano sora ni kaeru mirai de - Zenpen" (Japanese: あの空に還る未来で 前編)	Noboru Kimura	September 29, 2014	
Hina comes aboard the Cygnus with Aoba and Dio, and she must decide where her allegiances lie, eventually choosing to remain with Aoba. Meanwhile, her former comrades return home to Zogilia to find a shocking turn of events, when a coup d'etat at Zogilia put in power a Provisional Government Administration led by Evgeni Kendar, alias of Bizon Gerafil, who managed to survive the explosion, thus he was sent 70 years in the past, waiting for his revenge. However, the Free Pact Alliance is also shocked to found out that another powerful nectar cannon has been secretly built by Zogilia on an orbital satellite and this too must be destroyed. After a few weeks, the Cygnus and other ships are equipped to travel in outer space, however, they found out that the satellite is already completed and its heavily guarded by Alfred Gallant and his squad. Though in a precarious situation, Aoba, Dio, and the rest of the fleet are able to obtain some success, but Bizon decide to sacrifice his own troops in order to destroy Aoba, half of the fleet and even the Alaska base (which was occupied by the Alliance) using the Nectar Cannon. Aoba and Dio are able to escape death thanks to Hina's help, while the Cygnus and even Alfred Gallant barely manage to survive. At last, Bizon shows up in order to destroy Aoba armed with a special valiancer, created by Doctor Hahn, who is aboard the satellite, able of coupling with only one pilot (thus with some secondary effect to the pilot).
Final (Part 2)	"Into the Skies of Tomorrow – Second Half"; Transliteration: "Ano sora ni kaeru mirai de - Kōhen" (Japanese: あの空に還る未来で 後編)	Noboru Kimura	September 30, 2014	
Bizon attempts to exact his revenge, with his special valiancer who not only is able of coupling with only himself but can even interfere with the other coupling. After he makes several attempts to Aoba's life, Elvira is able (thank to the data of the previous Alaska battle) to allow Aoba to do a coupling with only himself too, getting rid of the interference of Bizon's coupling system. Right after, Dio, Hina and Aoba are able to do a coupling that allow all three of them to connect, the resonance of the process is even able to reach Bizon and, thanks to that, all four are able to connect their memories and found out the truth about Hina and Aoba. In fact, all four of them, found out that Hina and Aoba (in their late twenties – early thirties) were part of a project to create an early-coupling system in the early 21st century, however during the experimentation something had gone wrong and, originally Hina, not Aoba, was sent seventy years to the future, fighting in the Alliance, where during the Alaska Battle, due to the singularity, she managed to return to her timeline (but during her years as high school student), however Bizon (who originally never personally know Hina) later managed to appear at the school, targeting her, in the process Hina, having able to reach her valiancer, was able to defeat him and rescue Aoba (who was involved in the fight), but Bizon, in a manner similar to the first episode, was able to pull Hina and Aoba in the new singularity, where this time was Aoba to show up seventy years in the future with Dio, while Hina showed up, sixty years in the future, at Zagreb, where she was rescued by Ryazan and becoming a pilot in the Zogilia Army, creating the loop in which Aoba and Hina has always been trapped in. Having found the truth, Bizon realized that Hina and Aoba are responsible for ruining his life and decides to kill them both, but he's stopped by the combined attack of Dio, Hina and Aoba. Meanwhile, a counter coup d'etat occurs at Zogilia, and Alfred Gallant is put in charge of the orbital battle, declaring a ceasefire and the arrest of Evgeni Kendar, alias of Bizon. However instead of surrendering, Bizon decides (before his valiancer explodes, finally killing him) to activate a killer-program in the satellite, causing it to begin the sequence of firing on three high-deposit sites of Nectoribium (the element of the nectar weapons and technology) in order to make them explode and cause a nuclear winter on Earth. Dio and Aoba are able for the last time, connect and reach the satellite destroying it (also killing Dr. Hahn in the process), after having literally saved the world, another singularity is formed on the battlefield, and Aoba and Hina decide to reach it to return to their timeline, Aoba after having said his goodbye to Dio. In the aftermath, it is shown that the Zogilia Republic and the Free Pact Alliance have decided to begin peace talks, while most of the Cygnus crew continue their normal lives. Meanwhile Aoba and Hina, are back in their time, but have little to no memory of all that happened, continue theirs lives, eventually meeting once more.

== Home media ==
Bandai Visual began releasing the series in Japan on Blu-ray volumes starting on March 26, 2014.

Bandai Visual (Japan)
Vol.	Episodes	Blu-ray artwork	Bonus disc	Release date	Ref.
1	1, 2	Aoba Watase	Drama CD Vol.1	March 26, 2014	
2	3, 4	Dio Jyunyou Weinberg	Drama CD Vol.2	April 25, 2014	
3	5, 6	Hina Ryazan	Drama CD Vol.3	May 28, 2014	
4	7, 8	Alfried Gallant	Drama CD Vol.4	June 20, 2014	
5	9, 10	Bizon Gerafil	Drama CD Vol.5	July 25, 2014	
6	11, 12, 13	Aoba Watase & Dio Jyunyou Weinberg	Drama CD Vol.6	August 27, 2014	
0	Final Parts 1 & 2	Aoba Watase, Hina Ryazan, and Dio Jyunyou Weinberg	Drama CD Final	November 21, 2014	
