= 2014 in manga =

The following is an overview of 2014 in manga. It includes winners of notable awards, best-sellers, title debuts and endings, deaths of notable manga-related people as well as any other relevant manga-related events. For an overview of the year in comics from other countries, see 2014 in comics.

== Awards ==
- 38th Kodansha Manga Awards
  - Best Children's Manga: Yo-Kai Watch by Noriyuki Konishi
  - Best Shōnen Manga: Baby Steps by Hikaru Katsuki
  - Best Shōjo Manga: Taiyō no Ie by Ta'amo
  - Best General Manga: Shōwa Genroku Rakugo Shinjū by Haruko Kumota
- 7th Manga Taishō: A Bride's Story by Kaoru Mori
- 45th Seiun Awards
  - Best Comic: The World of Narue by Tomohiro Marukawa
- 59th Shogakukan Manga Awards
  - Best Children's Manga: Zekkyō Gakkyū by Emi Ishikawa
  - Best Shōnen Manga: Magi: The Labyrinth of Magic by Shinobu Ohtaka
  - Best Shōjo Manga: Kanojo wa Uso o Aishisugiteru by Kotomi Aoki
  - Best General Manga: Mogura no Uta by Noboru Takahashi
  - Judging Committee Special Award: Asari-chan by Mayumi Muroyama
- 18th Tezuka Osamu Cultural Prize
  - Grand Prize: March Comes in Like a Lion by Chica Umino
  - New Creator Prize: Machiko Kyō for Mitsuami no Kami-sama and other works
  - Short Work Prize: Yūki Shikawa for Onnoji and other works
  - Special Prize: Fujiko Fujio (A) for Manga Michi and Ai... Shirisomeshi Kei ni
  - Reader Prize: Space Brothers by Chūya Koyama

== Best-sellers ==
=== Titles ===
The following is a list of the 10 best-selling manga titles in Japan during 2014 according to Oricon.

Rank	Title	Copies
1	One Piece	11,885,957
2	Attack on Titan	11,728,368
3	Haikyu!!	8,283,709
4	Tokyo Ghoul	6,946,203
5	Kuroko's Basketball	6,729,439
6	Naruto	5,505,179
7	Ace of Diamond	4,681,031
8	Magi: The Labyrinth of Magic	4,657,971
9	The Seven Deadly Sins	4,633,246
10	Assassination Classroom	4,622,108

=== Volumes ===
The following is a list of the 10 best-selling manga volumes in Japan during 2014 according to Oricon. In 2014, there were 500,482,000 copies of manga volumes sold in Japan and the market for manga volumes in the country was worth ¥281.51 billion, representing 27.4% of the total book market of ¥1.02813 trillion. It was the largest segment of the book market by number of copies sold and the second-largest by value.

Rank	Volume	Copies
1	One Piece vol.73	810,801
2	One Piece vol.74	834,558
3	One Piece vol.75	698,071
4	Attack on Titan vol.13	921,457
5	Attack on Titan vol.12	895,305
6	Attack on Titan vol.13	773,871
7	Naruto vol.67	11,106,651
8	Naruto vol.68	16,098,121
9	Kimi ni Todoke vol.21	1,031,380
10	Naruto vol.69	1,007,954

== Title debuts ==
- January 9 - All You Need Is Kill, written by Ryōsuke Takeuchi and illustrated by Takeshi Obata
- January 9 - Gakuen Chaika!
- January 27 - Buddy Complex, illustrated by Hiroki Ohara
- January 27 - Buddy Complex: Coupling of Battlefield, illustrated by Sakae Saito
- January 28 - Alice in Murderland by Kaori Yuki
- January 28 - Inuyashiki by Hiroya Oku
- January - Etotama, written by Takashi Hoshi and Tōru Zekū and illustrated by Hiroma Hino
- February 12 - Fūka by Kōji Seo
- February 15 - Dungeon Meshi by Ryōko Kui
- February 25 - Himegoto by Norio Tsukudani
- March 14 - Jinsei, written by Jinsei: Manga no Shō and illustrated by Seiji Matsuyama
- March 20 - Baki-Dou by Keisuke Itagaki
- March 20 - Himouto! Umaru-chan by Sankaku Head
- March 24 - Tokyo Tarareba Musume by Akiko Higashimura
- March 28 - Bakumatsu Rock -howling soul- by Shinshu Ueda
- March - Amagi Brilliant Park, written by Shoji Gatoh and illustrated by Kimitake Yoshioka
- March - HappinessCharge PreCure!, written by Izumi Todo and illustrated by Futago Kamikita
- April - Chivalry of a Failed Knight, written by Riku Misora and illustrated by Megumi Soramichi
- April 4 - Hōzuki-san Chi no Aneki (+Imouto) by Ran Igarashi
- April 9 - Gangsta.:Cursed. EP_Marco Adriano, written by Kohske and illustrated by Syuhei Kamo
- April 14 - GTO: Paradise Lost by Tōru Fujisawa
- May 22 - Complex Age by Yui Sakuma
- May 22 - Is It Wrong to Try to Pick Up Girls in a Dungeon?: Sword Oratoria, written by Fujino Ōmori and illustrated by Kiyotaka Haimura
- May 26 - Hinomaru Zumō by Kawada
- May 27 - Alderamin on the Sky, illustrated by Taiki Kawakami
- May - The Fruit of Grisaia: L'Oiseau bleu, written by Jun'ichi Fujisaku and illustrated by Taka Himeno
- May - Yokokuhan: The Copycat, written by Tetsuya Tsutsui and illustrated by Fumio Obata
- June - Amagi Brilliant Park? Fumo, written by Shoji Gatoh and illustrated by Kōji Azuma
- June - Dagashi Kashi by Kotoyama
- June 9 - To the Abandoned Sacred Beasts by Maybe
- June 20 -Himegoto by Norio Tsukudani
- July 1 - Ao Oni: Anthology, written by Kenji Kuroda and illustrated by Karin Suzuragi
- July 3 - Hina's Lip, written by Kazemichi and illustrated by Mayumi Katō
- July 7 - My Hero Academia by Kōhei Horikoshi
- July 17 - Fairy Tail Zero by Hiro Mashima
- July 26 - Girl Friend (Kari): Shiina Kokomi-hen ~Koishite Madonna~, illustrated by Tsukako Akina
- July - Chain Chronicle Crimson by Junpei Okazaki
- August 2 - Fairy Tail: Blue Mistral by Rui Watanabe
- August 3 - Cross Ange by Kenjirō Takeshita
- August 11 - Aldnoah.Zero Season One, written by Olympus Knights and illustrated by Pinakes
- August 14 - Dungeon ni Deai o Motomeru no wa Machigatteiru Darō ka 4-koma: Kamisama no Nichijō by Masaya Takamura
- August 18 - Higanjima 48 Nichigo... by Kōji Matsumoto
- August 22 - Girl Friend (Kari): Murakami Fumio-hen ~Secret Smile~, illustrated by Takahiro Seguchi
- August 22 - Girl Friend (Kari): Chloe Lemarie-hen ~Chole to Nihon to Mirai no Tobira~, illustrated by Sawayoshi Azuma
- August 22 - Girl Friend (Kari): Sakurai Akane-hen ~Kokoro o Komete, Yūki no On Air!~, illustrated by Kakao
- August 22 - Girl Friend (Kari) ~Seiō Gakuen Girl's Diary~, illustrated by Na!
- August 26 - Code Geass: Oz the Reflection O2, written by Toujou Chika and Shigeru Morita and illustrated by Toujou Chika
- August 27 - Celestial Method, written by Naoki Hisaya and illustrated by Yuka Namisaki
- September 5 - Girls und Panzer, written by Takaaki Suzuki and illustrated by Takeshi Nogami
- September 22 - Hetalia World Stars by Hidekaz Himaruya
- September 28 - Battle Rabbits by Yuki Amemiya and Yukino Ichihara
- October 5 - Cross Ange: Tenshi to Ryū no Ecole by Osaji
- October 16 - Salty Road, written by Ark Performance and illustrated by TALI
- October 16 - Cute High Earth Defense Club Love! by Umatani Kurari
- October 27 - Absolute Duo Tea Party, written by Takumi Hiiragiboshi and illustrated by Tōru Oiwaka
- October 28 - Gunnm: Mars Chronicle by Yukito Kishiro
- October - Gundam Reconguista in G by Tamon Ōta
- November 19 - Girls und Panzer: Gekitou! Maginot-sen Desu!! by Ryūichi Saitaniya
- November 26 - Ai Tenchi Muyo!, written by Masaki Kajishima and illustrated by Haruna Nakazato
- December 12 - Aldnoah.Zero Gaiden: Twin Gemini, written by Kiyokazu Satake
- December - In Search of the Lost Future, written by Trumple and Atelier High Key and illustrated by Takeshi Kagura
- December - Masuda Kōsuke Gekijō Gag Manga Biyori GB by Kōsuke Masuda
- Ange Vierge Linkage, written by Mako Komao and illustrated by Sakaki Yoshioka
- Gakusei Shima Kōsaku
- Princess Maison, written and illustrated by Aoi Ikebe

== Title endings ==
- March 5 - Girls und Panzer by Ryūichi Saitaniya
- April 9 - Again! by Mitsurō Kubo
- May 29 - All You Need Is Kill, written by Ryōsuke Takeuchi and illustrated by Takeshi Obata
- May - A-bout!! - Asagiri Daikatsuyaku Hen by Ichikawa Masa
- June 28 - No Regrets, written by Gun Snark and illustrated by Hikaru Suruga
- July 26 - Code Geass: Oz the Reflection, written by Toujou Chika and Shigeru Morita and illustrated by Toujou Chika
- August 27 - Buddy Complex: Coupling of Battlefield, illustrated by Sakae Saito
- September 5 - Higanjima: Saigo no 47 Nichikan by Kōji Matsumoto
- September 27 - Abyss of Hyperspace, written by Tatsuo Sato and illustrated by Chibimaru
- September - The Comic Artist and His Assistants 2 by Hiroyuki
- October 27 - Buddy Complex, illustrated by Hiroki Ohara
- October - Battle Spirits: Saikyou Ginga Ultimate Zero, written by Hajime Yatate and illustrated by Masato Ichishiki
- November 10 - Naruto by Masashi Kishimoto
- November - 37.5°C no Namida by Chika Shiina
- November - Gag Manga Biyori by Kōsuke Masuda
- December 11 - Gakuen Chaika!
- December 31 - Sungeki no Kyojin by hounori

== Deaths ==
- Hiroshi Obi, manga artist

== See also ==
- 2014 in anime
