= Buddy Complex =

Japanese anime television series

- Blu-ray cover of Buddy Complex Final
- バディ・コンプレックス
- Genre: Mecha, action, Military science fiction
- Created by: Hajime Yatate
- Developed by: BC project
- Directed by: Yasuhiro Tanabe
- Music by: Tatsuya Kato
- Country of origin: Japan
- Original language: Japanese
- No. of episodes: 13 (list of episodes)

Production
- Executive producers: Shin Sasaki; Kouchi Ueyama; Toru Konno
- Producers: Tadashi Hirayama; Yuki Marimoto; Shinya Satake
- Animator: Sunrise
- Production companies: Sunrise; Bandai Visual; Namco Bandai Games; Banpresto; Lantis; Bandai Channel; Namco Bandai Live Creative

Original release
- Network: Tokyo MX, TVA, ytv, BS11
- Release: January 5 – March 30, 2014

Related
- Manga
- Illustrated by: Hiroki Ohara
- Published by: ASCII Media Works
- Magazine: Dengeki Daioh
- Original run: January 27, 2014 – October 27, 2014
- Volumes: 2
- Manga

Buddy Complex: Coupling of Battlefield
- Illustrated by: Sakae Saito
- Published by: ASCII Media Works
- Magazine: Dengeki Maoh
- Original run: January 27, 2014 – August 27, 2014
- Volumes: 1
- Video game

Buddy Complex: Coupling of Battlefield
- Publisher: Namco Bandai Games
- Genre: RPG
- Platform: iOS, Android
- Released: iOS: JP: March 7, 2014; Android: JP: March 10, 2014
- Anime television series

Buddy Complex Final Chapter: Into the Skies of Tomorrow
- Directed by: Yasuhiro Tanabe
- Written by: BC project
- Music by: Tatsuya Kato
- Studio: Sunrise
- Licensed by: NA: Crunchyroll
- Original network: Tokyo MX, TVA, ytv, BS11, Bandai Channel
- Original run: September 29, 2014 – September 30, 2014
- Episodes: 2

Buddy Complex (バディ・コンプレックス, Badi Konpurekkusu) is a Japanese mecha anime television series produced by Sunrise. The series aired between January 5, 2014, and March 30, 2014. The first episode was pre-aired on December 29, 2013. A manga adaptation began serialization in ASCII Media Works' Dengeki Daioh from January 27, 2014. A 2-part sequel aired on September 29 and 30, 2014.

== Plot ==
Buddy Complex revolves around the main character, Aoba Watase, an ordinary high school boy. He lived an average, everyday life commuting to high school in the city. On the first day back after summer break, Aoba is attacked by a giant robot that appears out of the sky. As he's pursued through the city, his classmate Hina Yumihara appears in a giant robot of her own. She rescues him, and tells him cryptically that "Dio is waiting," before she sends Aoba into the future and then disappears. When Aoba wakes up, he finds himself over seventy years into the future, where the Free Pact Alliance and the Zogilia Republic are at war with each other, and there he meets a young pilot named Dio Junyou Weinberg. This begins Aoba's new life as a pilot of the Free Pact Alliance, and together with Dio, they would change the fate of the world.

== Characters ==
=== Main characters ===
Aoba Watase (渡瀬 青葉, Watase Aoba)
Voiced by: Yoshitsugu Matsuoka
Aoba is the main protagonist. At 16 years old, he is a first year student at Seio High School. Aoba is a bright, considerate young man. He excels at athletics, especially basketball. He was an ordinary Japanese high school student from 2014 who got transported into the year 2088 and now fights for the Free Pact Alliance. He is the pilot of the Coupling Valiancer Luxon, and later Luxon Next. He has exceptional compatibility as a Coupler. He was surprised to see Hina as the Zogilia pilot with no memories of him from the past and even tries to kill him when he offered his hand to her to come into Luxon's cockpit. Despite knowing that Hina was the enemy, Aoba doesn't want to fight her because she is the girl who saved his life. After another encounter with Hina and he talked with her, Aoba was almost convinced she was not the same Hina as the Hina Yumihara who saved him. But he doesn't seem to care about it anymore, when he invites Hina to join the Cygnus after her father's death, even though his effort to bring Hina to his side is ruined by Bizon. Later, he realizes she is indeed the same Hina who saved his life and he decides to save her from her fate.
Hina Yumihara (弓原 雛, Yumihara Hina)/ Hina Ryazan (ヒナ・リャザン, Hina Ryazan)
Voiced by: Saori Hayami
Hina is the main heroine. She is a first year student at Seio High School. Hina Yumihara is Aoba's classmate who ends up next to him in class following seat changes after the break and seems to have feelings for him. She keeps acting cold, stiff, and formal toward Aoba that makes Aoba thinks he did something to her. She is actually a mecha pilot from the future who has a mission to protect Aoba from opposing mecha from the same future with her who wants to kill him. She sent Aoba into the future, where she had not yet met Aoba and served as a pilot of Zogilia Republic, enemy of the Free Pact Alliance. In Zogilia, Hina is the daughter of veteran Lieutenant Commander of Zogilian military, Viktor Ryazan. She was assigned to Alfried's squad as the pilot of the Fortuna but later transferred to Zogilia's Adminburo as the pilot of Coupling Valiancer Karura. During her first encounter with Aoba, she's confused an enemy pilot knew her name. She even tries to kill him when he offered his hand to her to come into Luxon's cockpit. She's intrigued by Aoba's kindness after he saved her when they were stranded together on deserted island even though they are each other's enemy soldier and he also gave her the pink cat hairpin that belongs to Hina Yumihara. But, it caused her childhood friend Bizon who is in love with her to scold her and despises Aoba.
Dio Junyou Weinberg (隼鷹・ディオ・ウェインバーグ, Jun'yō Dio Weinbāgu)
Voiced by: Kōki Uchiyama
Dio is the 16 year old ace pilot of the Free Pact Alliance. He is the pilot of Coupling Valiancer Bradyon and later Bradyon Next. He's calm and stoic, but he has a strong sense of justice in his heart. He usually looks down on Aoba. After he saw the images of Aoba's memories during Coupling using the old Valiancers, he starts to believe Aoba and helps him to get through Hina and saves her.

=== Free Pact Alliance ===
The Free Pact Alliance, formally called the Confederate Treaty of Liberty (自由条約連合, Jiyū Jōyaku Rengō), is a long-standing alliance between Japan and North American and Western European countries to counter the advance of the Zogilia Republic.

==== Crew of the Cygnus ====
Gengo Kuramitsu (倉光 源吾, Kuramitsu Gengo)
Voiced by: Shō Hayami
Captain of the Cygnus. He often seems unreliable and doesn't stand out much, but he gives precise orders based on sharp judgment when it counts.
Lene Kleinbeck (レーネ・クラインベック, Rēne Kurainbekku)
Voiced by: Ayumi Fujimura
Vice-captain of the Cygnus. She is an excellent battlefield commander, and Captain Kuramitsu places a lot of trust in her.
Lee Conrad (リー・コンラッド, Rī Konraddo)
Voiced by: Tomokazu Sugita
Captain of the Cygnus' valiancer unit. Pilot of Beryl Commander. He is friendly and caring and acts like an older brother to those aboard Cygnus.
Jarl Duran (ヤール・ドゥラン, Yāru Duran)
Voiced by: Hiroyuki Yoshino
Member of the Cygnus' valiancer unit. Pilot of Beryl Assault. Though often sarcastic, he sometimes shows great care for his comrades as well.
Fromm Vantarhei (フロム・ヴァンタレイ, Furomu Vantarei)
Voiced by: Yūki Kaji
New member of the Cygnus' valiancer unit. Pilot of Beryl Explorer. He was Dio's classmate and Coupling buddy during Couplers Training at Lake Louise. He is also capable of Coupling with Aoba.
Elvira Hill (エルヴィラ・ヒル, Eruvira Hiru)
Voiced by: Rina Satō
A scientist in charge of the Coupling System. Developed the specialized cockpit that is used in Luxon and Braydon. She was an apprentice of Alessandro Fermi and is an extremely skilled researcher. Her personality is bright and active. She seems to be in a relationship with Lee Conrad.
Mayuka Nasu (奈須 まゆか, Nasu Mayuka)
Voiced by: Kana Hanazawa
Cygnus's bridge crew member and Elvira Hill's aid but practical matters are left in her care. She's honest and straightforward, but a bit shy. She was one of the first people to interact with Aoba upon his arrival to the Cygnus. She seems to have feelings for Aoba and worries that if given the chance Aoba would leave them and return to his own time period.
Anessa Rossetti (アネッサ・ロセッティ, Anessa Rosetti)
Voiced by: Marina Inoue
Cygnus's bridge crew member. She is operator in charge of controlling Cygnus' valiancer unit. Unlike her friend Mayuka, she's full of energy.
Tusais Framboise (チュセ・フランボワ, Chuse Furanbowa)
Voiced by: Ryōhei Kimura
Cygnus's bridge crew member and is responsible of the Cygnus's radar. He has neck-length bob hair.
Garcian Bass (ガルシアン・バース, Garushian Bāsu)
Voiced by: Arthur Lounsbery
Cygnus's bridge crew member and is responsible of the Cygnus's weapon systems. He wears eyeglasses.
Soeharto (スハルト, Suharuto)
Voiced by: Eiji Miyashita
Cygnus's bridge crew member and is responsible of the Cygnus's navigation. He has tan skin and curly hair.
Saburota Ogisaka (荻坂 三郎太, Ogisaka Saburōta)
Voiced by: Minoru Shiraishi
Cygnus's bridge crew member. He is responsible of the Cygnus's engines management. He serves as head instructor for Aoba's new recruit training.
Don Naher (ドン・ナッハー, Don Nahhā)
Voiced by: Nobuyuki Kobushi
Chief mechanic on the Cygnus.
Mishima (三島)
Voiced by: Arthur Lounsbery
Mishima was introduced in Buddy Complex Kanketsu-hen as extra pilot of Cygnus's valiancer unit. He admired Aoba as a fellow Japanese and a Coupler. He was the pilot of one of the Alliance's valiancers that got wiped out by second Gorgon.

==== Others ====
Sadamichi Junyō Weinberg (隼鷹・貞道・ウェインバーグ, Jun'yō Sadamichi Weinbāgu)
Voiced by: Hiroshi Naka
Dio and Fiona's father.
Fiona Junyō Weinberg (隼鷹・フィオナ・ウェインバーグ, Jun'yō Fiona Weinbāgu)
Voiced by: Aoi Yūki
Fiona is the younger sister of Dio. She is 12 years old. She was injured in a Zogilia attack that took the life of her mother prior to the events of the series. As a result she uses a wheelchair. She deeply cares about her brother's well-being and hopes that one day he and their father will reconcile.
Alessandro Fermi (アレッサンドロ・フェルミ, Aressandoro Ferumi)
Voiced by: Ryūsuke Ōbayashi
Elvira's mentor. Team leader of Coupling system's development team.
Richardson (リチャードソン, Richādoson)
Voiced by: Hiroshi Naka
Vice admiral and Pacific Fleet Acting Commander of Free Pact Alliance's military. He is skeptical about the Coupling System.
Green (グリーン, Gurīn)
Voiced by: Eiji Miyashita
Rear Admiral and 1st Navy Special Squadron Commander of Free Pact Alliance's military. He believes Coupling System will become a force to overturn the war.

=== Zogilia Republic ===
Zogilia Republic, formally called Republic of Great Zogilia (大ゾギリア共和国, Dai Zogiria Kyōwakoku) is a small nation that quickly grew into a superpower by conquering neighboring countries and expanding its territory along mainland Asia, Russia, Eastern Europe, and Scandinavia.

==== Alfried Gallant's squad ====
Alfried Gallant (アルフリード・ガラント, Arufurīdo Garanto)
Voiced by: Toshiyuki Morikawa
Captain of Trident and later Vajra. Pilot of Alsiel. He is a Commander assigned to 501st Mobile Company, 193 U-boat Brigade. He possesses great skill in strategic commands in addition to his clever Valiancer piloting skills.
Bizon Gerafil (ビゾン・ジェラフィル, Bizon Jerafiru) / Evgeni Kedar (エフゲニー・ケダール, Efugenī Kedāru)
Voiced by: Takahiro Sakurai
Member of Alfried's squad but later transferred to Zogilia's Adminburo together with Hina. Bizon is 20 years old. He is childhood friend of Hina. He is an honest soldier born to a prominent family. He's well trusted by Alfried and often given charge of the front lines. He is the pilot of Nebiros and later Coupling Valiancer Nergal. He is in love with Hina to a point that can be considered borderline obsession. He despises Aoba for trying to rescue Hina during a battle because it caused her to be put under suspicion of being a traitor but then later his hatred toward Aoba grows because of jealousy that Aoba intrigued Hina. An aged Bizon appears in the future, seeming to have survived Dio and Aoba's assault, looking far older, implying he stayed in the past and seems to be in a very influential position in Zogilia's army. He still holds a grudge against Aoba.
Tarjim Vasily (タルジム・ヴァシリー, Tarujimu Vashirī)
Voiced by: Nobunaga Shimazaki
Member of Alfried's squad. Pilot of Ogre. He's aggressive, headstrong, and reckless. His strength in combat is great, but his personality is his true fault.
Lasha Hakkarainen (ラーシャ・ハッカライネン, Rāsha Hakkarainen)
Voiced by: Mutsumi Tamura
Member of Alfried's squad. Pilot of Krishna. He's a gentle, tender hearted young man, but he faces his enemies bravely in battle.
Margaret O'Keefe (マルガレタ・オキーフ, Marugareta Okīfu)
Voiced by: Yumi Uchiyama
Special Officer, dispatched by Zogilia's Administration Bureau to supervise Alfried's squad. She often considers her reputation and status above all else.
Ga Sirojanko (ガ・シロヤンコ, Ga Shiroyanko)
Voiced by: Kazuaki Ito
Lieutenant Commander assigned to 501st Mobile Company, 193 U-boat Brigade. He is in charge of command in Vajra Aeroship under Commander Alfried Gallant.

==== Others ====
Wilhelm Hahn (ヴィルヘルム・ハーン, Viruherumu Hān)
Voiced by: Takehito Koyasu
A scientist who defected to Zogilia from Free Pact Alliance. He orders Alfried's squad to steal Alliance's Coupling Valiancer to get Elvira's specialized cockpit that is used for Coupling System.
Viktor Ryazan (ヴィクトル・リャザン, Vikutoru Ryazan)
Voiced by: Yōsuke Akimoto
Hina's father. He found Hina in Zagreb ten years ago then took her in as a war orphan and raised her as his own daughter. He is a Lieutenant Commander of Zogilian military assigned to 101st Independent Reconnaissance Brigade. During the infiltration of the Alliance's Hawaiian base, Viktor was shot and managed to tell Hina about his adoption of her before he died.
Nestor Viktorovich Dorzhiev (ネストル・ヴィクトロヴィチ・ドルジエフ, Nesutoru Vikutorovuichi Dorujiefu)
Voiced by: Hiroshi Tsuchida
1st Airborne Division Commander, Protection Division of Zogilia Adminburo. He is Captain of Gae Bulg. He's first thwarted by Dio using Beryl Explorer and later killed by Aoba and Dio using Luxon and Bradyon.
Konev (コーネフ, Kōnefu)
Voiced by: Kiyomitsu Mizuuchi
Senior Admiral and National Defense Force Siberian Front Commander of Zogilia Military. He assigns Aeroship Vajra to Alfried's unit as a present for bringing down Chitose.
Kagan (カガン, Kagan)
Voiced by: Nobuyuki Kobushi
Vice Admiral and 3rd Alaskan Unit Siberian Front Commander of Zogilia Military. He accepts the draft strategy proposed by Margaret as part of Alfried's plan to fire the giant nectar gun Gala Puska.

=== 2014 Characters ===
Tsubasa Watase (渡瀬 翼, Watase Tsubasa)
Voiced by: Mai Goto
Tsubasa is Aoba's younger sister who lives with him and their single mother. She is a middle schooler.
Tomoyo Watase (渡瀬 朋世, Watase Tomoyo)
Voiced by: Miina Obata
Tomoyo is Aoba and Tsubasa's mother.
Ryutaro Imajo (今城 隆太郎, Imajiyou Ryūtarou)
Voiced by: Takashi Ōhara
Ryutaro is Aoba's best friend and classmate at Seio High School. He and Aoba were both on basketball club in middle school but he ended up getting injured and both of them quit. Aoba attends the same high school with him because it's close to the hospital where Ryutaro gets his physical therapy.
Junichi Suhara (須原 純一, Suhara Junichi)
Voiced by: Shōta Chōnan
Junichi is Aoba's friend and classmate at Seio High School. He, Aoba, and Ryutaro play basketball together after school. Both Junichi and Ryutaro realize that Hina's been watching Aoba ever since the entrance ceremony and think she likes Aoba.

== Development ==
Sunrise filed for a trademark on the use of the words "Buddy Complex" in a logo on October 1, 2013. Despite making the trademark for a host of media items, the company had yet to announce any plans for the project. This changed on December 1, 2013, when the company unveiled a website in an announcement that they were developing the "traditional robot action" series, Buddy Complex.

== Media ==
=== Anime ===
The anime series is produced by Sunrise in collaboration with Bandai Visual, Bandai Channel, Lantis, Banpresto, and Bandai Namco Games under Bandai Namco Holdings. It is an original creation of Hajime Yatate and is directed by Yasuhiro Tanabe, with series composition by BC Project. The series features character designs and animation direction by Asako Inayoshi and Tomoshige Inayoshi and music by Tatsuya Katou. The first episode received an advanced pre-broadcast on Tokyo MX on December 29, 2013. Following episodes premiered on Tokyo MX on January 5, 2014, with later airings on YTV, TVA, BS11 and Bandai Channel. The opening theme is "Unisonia" by Miho Karasawa under the name True while the ending theme is "Ano Sora ni Kaeru Mirai de" (あの空に帰る未来で) by ChouCho. Funimation streamed the series on their video website, beginning on January 6, 2014. Daisuki streamed the episodes worldwide on their website as well as on their official YouTube Channel. The series aired 13 episodes which ended on March 30, 2014. Bandai Visual will begin releasing the series in Japan on Blu-ray volumes starting on March 26, 2014.

A 2-part sequel titled Buddy Complex Final Chapter: Into the Skies of Tomorrow (バディ・コンプレックス 完結編 ―あの空に還る未来で―, Badi Konpurekkusu Kanketsu-hen: Ano Sora ni Kaeru Mirai de) aired on September 29 and 30, 2014. It features the insert song "Twin Bird" performed by True.

=== Manga ===
A manga adaptation began serialization in ASCII Media Works' Dengeki Daioh from January 27 to October 27, 2014. Two compiled volumes were released in Japan on March 27 and November 27, 2014, respectively. A separate manga based on the smartphone game was serialized from January 27 to August 27, 2014, in ASCII Media Works' Dengeki Maoh. The compiled volume was released in Japan on September 27, 2014.

=== Video game ===
A free-to-play multi-player smartphone game titled Buddy Complex: Coupling of Battlefield (バディ・コンプレックス 戦場のカップリング, Badi Konpurekkusu: Senjō no Kappuringu) was released by Bandai Namco Games for iOS and Android devices in Japan on March 7, 2014, with theme song "Orbital Line" by Erica Masaki.
