= List of Mekakucity Actors episodes =

Cover of the first DVD volume of Mekakucity Actors released by Aniplex, featuring Ene.

Mekakucity Actors (メカクシティアクターズ, Mekakushiti Akutāzu; lit. Blindfold City Actors) is a 2014 anime television series produced by Shaft, based on the Kagerou Project created by Jin. The series began airing in Japan from April 12, 2014, and was simulcasted by Crunchyroll. The series is licensed in North America by Aniplex of America. The opening theme is "Daze" by Maria from Garnidelia, and the ending theme is "Days" by Lia. The story follows a group known as the Mekakushi-Dan (Blindfold Gang), consisting of various people possessing unique powers.

The series is directed by Yūki Yase and chief directed by Akiyuki Shinbo. The original creator, Jin, wrote the series composition and screenplay to the series, and also composed the music alongside several other artists. Genichirou Abe (Shaft) designed the characters.

== Episode list ==
No.	Title	Directed by (Note: Information is taken from the ending credits of each episode.)	Storyboarded by	Chief animation director	Original release date
1	"Artificial Enemy"; Transliteration: "Jinzō Enemī" (Japanese: 人造エネミー)	Yuki Yase	Yuki Yase	Naoto Nakamura	April 12, 2014
Shintarō Kisaragi is an 18-year-old recluse and NEET who spends pretty much his entire life on the computer. On August 14, while arguing with an artificial intelligence called Ene living inside of his computer, he accidentally spills soda on his keyboard, leaving it damaged beyond repair. With no online stores being able to deliver a new keyboard quickly due to the Obon holiday, Shintarō has no choice but to actually go out in public for the first time in two years to buy a new keyboard himself. Upon arriving in the department store, however, he ends up becoming a hostage as a group of terrorists lay siege to the store, taking over the security controls and putting the place in lockdown. Whilst sitting amongst the hostages, a peculiar boy comes up to Shintarō, asking him if he has a plan to escape. Taking Ene into consideration, Shintarō replies that he has a plan with a 100% chance of success, provided that someone makes a good enough distraction. Surely enough, a big distraction occurs, as monitors and shelves start toppling over, seemingly by themselves, giving Shintarō the opportunity to plug Ene into the security system so that she can put it back under her control, at which point Shintarō passes out.
2	"Kisaragi Attention"; Transliteration: "Kisaragi Atenshon" (Japanese: 如月アテンション)	Yukihiro Miyamoto	Tomoya Takahashi	Haruka Tanaka	April 19, 2014
Prior to the events of the previous episode, Shintarō's younger sister, a pop singer named Momo Kisaragi, has trouble coming to school on time as she keeps inadvertently drawing the attention of her fans. This leads to a long conversation from her teacher, Kenjirō Tateyama, who tells her to make sure she keeps up her studies to avoiding repeating the year. Later, as Momo receives word from her agent that she has the rest of the day off, she looks back on her life leading up to this point. Ever since her childhood, Momo had a seemingly uncanny ability of attracting people's attention towards her, even attracting the attention of an idol agency. Despite this, she had also received sarcastic remarks from her friends, whose own efforts were ignored as people only focused on Momo's works. After her mother dies due to a sudden illness, Momo made the decision to become an idol. Whilst trying to keep a low profile on her day off, Momo runs into a young boy who ends up causing Momo to draw attention to herself, leading to both of them being chased around by fans. After Momo ends up losing her fans, along with the boy, she is approached by a peculiar woman.
3	"Blindfold Code"; Transliteration: "Mekakushi Kōdo" (Japanese: メカクシコード)	Kenjirou Okada	Takashi Kawabata	Hiroki Yamamura	April 26, 2014
The woman, known as Tsubomi Kido, tells Momo she is just like her, demonstrating her own ability to become unnoticed by anyone, which is the opposite of Momo's power of attracting people's attention. Kido takes Momo to the hideout of the Mekakushi Dan (Blindfold Gang), introducing her to three other members; Kōsuke Seto, Shūya Kano, and Marry Kozakura, who also possess their own unique powers. As Kido and the others offer her the chance to learn how to control her power, Momo excitingly accepts, which causes Marry to spill a tray of drinks, with Momo's phone becoming broken in the ensuing chaos. The group goes to the department store to buy Momo a replacement phone, using Kido's power to remain unnoticed, during which they spot Shintarō. After Shintarō gets involved in the terrorist situation, Seto and Kano sneak into the crowd to meet with Shintarō, using their respective abilities to blend into the crowd and read other people's minds. Upon learning about Shintarō's escape plan, Momo plots out the ideal distraction, in which Kido uses her low presence to create a ruckus within the store before Momo uses her ability to bring the terrorists' attention towards the eyes of Marry, whose ability causes anyone she locks eyes with to freeze in place, allowing Shintarō and Ene to carry out their plan.
4	"Heat Haze Daze"; Transliteration: "Kagerō Deizu" (Japanese: カゲロウデイズ)	Hironori Aoyanagi	Yuki Yase	Naoto Nakamura	May 3, 2014
After getting caught up in the chase with Momo, the young boy named as Hibiya Amamiya spends time with his friend, Hiyori Asahina, who he has a crush on. However, his plans to spend the summer with Hiyori is hindered by both her cold attitude towards him and her smitten behaviour towards the strange resident, Konoha. The following day, on August 15, Hibiya finds himself in what appears to be a dream in which Hiyori is hit by a truck while chasing after a black cat, whispering something before she is hit. As this dream seems to loop, Hibiya attempts to keep Hiyori from danger, but she is always killed in some manner upon encountering the same black cat. In the end, Hibiya decides to take Hiyori's place as the victim by throwing himself in front of the oncoming truck, mocking the cat before he is hit.
5	"Kaien Panzermast (Showtime Loudspeaker Pole)"; Transliteration: "Kaien Panzamasuto" (Japanese: カイエンパンザマスト)	Takashi Kawabata	Takashi Kawabata	Haruka Tanaka	May 10, 2014
Shintarō awakens at the Mekakushi-Dan's hideout, finding himself in an awkward situation when he is caught in his underwear trying to get Ene to tell him where he is. After the situation eventually dies down, Shintarō is informed that he and Ene have been made members of the Mekakushi-Dan, much to his dismay. As the others decide to go to visit the grave of the founder and former commander of the Mekakushi-Dan, who committed suicide two years ago, Shintarō storms off elsewhere, where he ends up encountering Konoha, who is searching for Hibiya and Hiyori, and gets roped into helping him. When they spot the two children being dragged into a van by some mysterious people, Konoha rushes in to rescue them, displaying superhuman strength, but soon a truck comes skidding towards them. Meanwhile, as the others arrive at the commander's grave, where Kido shows a picture of the commander, Ene recognises her as a girl named Ayano Tateyama.
6	"Headphone Actor"; Transliteration: "Heddofon Akutā" (Japanese: ヘッドフォンアクター)	Yoshiko Mikami	Mamoru Kurosawa	Hiroki Yamamura	May 17, 2014
Prior to the start of the series, Takane Enomoto and Haruka Kokonose are both classmates tasked by Kenjirō with creating a special project for their school culture festival, deciding to go with a shooting video game. During the festival, a young boy (Kano) brings in a young girl, Tsubomi, to Takane's booth to play the game Kenjirō designed, with Tsubomi showing exceptional skill in the game whilst Takane finds her experience mysteriously hampered, which Shūya later reveals was cheating on Tsubomi's part. Later, Takane tries to hide from people interested in playing against her due to her ranking 2nd in a gaming tournament, but Haruka gives her the confidence to face them. However, she becomes shocked when Shintarō comes by the booth and completely defeats her. Afterwards, Takane is introduced to Kenjirō's daughter, Ayano, who reveals she and Shintarō will become her schoolmates, and the group get to know each other over the following year. On August 15th, during summer classes, Takane decides to ignore Haruka as he sleeps, unaware that he is actually in pain.
7	"Konoha's State of the World"; Transliteration: "Konoha no Sekai Jijou" (Japanese: コノハの世界事情)	Tatsuma Minamikawa	Naruse Takahashi	Naoto Nakamura	May 24, 2014
After discovering Haruka had become hospitalized after collapsing, Takane runs into Ayano at school, who tells her she needs to be more courageous and tell Haruka what she needs to tell him, leading her to realise that she loves him. Moments later however, she falls unconscious herself and dies. She then says her last words, "Haruka, I love you." After coming in contact with a mysterious void, she eventually awakens as Ene. Back in the present, as Ene finishes explaining her situation, Kano reveals that her situation is exactly like what the other Mekakushi-Dan members went through before. Just then, Seto calls informing the gang about the traffic incident that Shintarō was involved in. While Momo, Kido, and Marry go to check on him, Ene stays behind with Kano to ask him for more details, not wanting Shintarō to hear anything, since he doesn't know Ene and Takane are the same person, only to learn that Haruka had also died alongside Ayano. In a flashback, it is revealed that Haruka's desire to have a strong body led to a peculiar situation of his own: Konoha.
8	"Lost Time Memory"; Transliteration: "Rosutaimu Memorī" (Japanese: ロスタイムメモリー)	Keishi Kawakubo	Kazuhiro Soeta	Haruka Tanaka	May 31, 2014
After Momo's group catches up with him at the hospital, Shintarō tries to explain his situation as best he can. After running into Hibiya, who seems aware that the incident was no accident, Shintarō tries to get some information out of him, but he suddenly collapses. Realising that Hibiya could be manifesting a power of his own, Kido has him taken back to the hideout to recover. As Seto goes off to search for Kano, Kido explains to Shintarō and Momo about how each of the Mekakushi-Dan's members gained their powers after escaping from a mysterious void, called the "Heat-Haze", which appears during near-death experiences, with Momo gaining her powers after nearly drowning, losing her father in the rift in the process. Hibiya, who had overheard that Hiyori is trapped in the rift, runs off in search for her. While Kido and Momo chase after him, Shintarō discovers a photo of Ayano whilst checking up on Marry.
9	"Ayano's Theory of Happiness"; Transliteration: "Ayano no Kōfuku Riron" (Japanese: アヤノの幸福理論)	Seimei Kidokoro; Taiki Konno (Note: Ayaka's Diary (彩花の日記).)	Seimei Kidokoro; Taiki Konno	Hiroki Yamamura	June 7, 2014
The episode looks back as Ayano and her family takes in Tsubomi, Kōsuke, and Shūya, helping them to control their powers. Ayano acted like a big sister to her companions, staying strong even after her mother was lost in a landslide. One day, Ayano discovered some notes written by mother, researching an old folk tale that appears to hold the origin of the children's powers. Later on, following the school festival, Ayano realised from reading her mother's notes that Kenjirō also possessed powers of his own, an alleged 'snake' that had its own will, asking Shūya to help her investigate. Back in the present, Kano, who had been explaining the story to Ene, explains that the king 'snake' is trying to bring together all the other 'snakes' in this world, before leading her to a secret laboratory inside a school where Ene's real body, Takane, is being kept.
10	"Fantasy Forest"; Transliteration: "Kūsō Foresuto" (Japanese: 空想フォレスト)	Hironori Aoyanagi	Mamoru Kurosawa	Naoto Nakamura	June 14, 2014
A past event is shown where a mysterious woman named Azami is attacked by men believing her to be a monster, but she fights back using her powers in order to protect her daughter, Shion Kozakura. After learning from the remaining survivor about how her husband, Tsukihiko, got hurt trying to defend her, Azami makes the painful decision to leave her family behind in order to protect them from any further harm. As time went by, Shion eventually gave birth to Marry and raised her by herself, making sure she wouldn't leave her home. One day, when Marry steps outside, she is caught by a pair of thieves, and although Shion uses her powers to stop one of the thieves, she is weakened, as a result and they are both killed by the second thief. As both Marry and Shion are dragged into the same realm as Azami, ruled over by a large snake, as a result of dying on August 15, Azami uses the last of her strength to pass on her role to Marry, allowing her to return to the real world. Some time later, Kōsuke hears Marry's internal cries with his own power and comes across her, deciding to become friends with her. Back in the present, Marry comes across Konoha on the street and takes him back to the hideout, deciding to become friends with him and take him to where the others are.
11	"Moon Viewing Recital"; Transliteration: "Otsukimi Risaitaru" (Japanese: オツキミリサイタル)	Takashi Kawabata (Note: Assisted by Tatsuma Minamikawa.)	Takashi Kawabata	Haruka Tanaka; Akihisa Takano	June 21, 2014
Shintarō wakes up and recalls a tragedy that he had seen over and over in his dreams, awakening to a power which he always had (The "Retaining eyes" ability), before taking a pair of scissors to his throat. Meanwhile, Momo and Kido catch up to Hibiya and offer to help him search for Hiyori, but are suddenly surrounded by a group of people. Elsewhere, Kano recalls how Ayano, who rejected the idea of sacrificing the other snake-wielders in order to grant her father's desire to see her mother again, confronted the snake-possessing Kenjirō before committing suicide and becoming swallowed by the Heat Haze in order to prevent him from achieving all the snakes needed. Despite Ayano's sacrifice, the snake refused to relinquish Kenjirō, stating his plans to start from scratch by using Takane and Haruka's bodies. Back in the present, as Momo and the others are imprisoned by their kidnappers, Momo uses her powers to attract all the Mekakushi-Dan's members, including Ene, who had returned to her original body, to their location. Meanwhile, in an unknown location, Shintarō reunites with Ayano.
12	"Summertime Record"; Transliteration: "Samātaimu Recōdo" (Japanese: サマータイムレコード)	Yuki Yase (Note: Assisted by Yukihiro Miyamoto.)	Yuki Yase	Hiroki Yamamura	June 28, 2014
Kano informs the group of the situation as they make their escape, using their powers to get past all of the guards. When the group end up getting lost, Hibiya uses his power of clairvoyance to pinpoint Kenjirō's location and soon arrive in his lab. The snake claims that the current world was created by Marry due to her wish to be with her friends, resulting in a endless loop of the snake being revived. The snake then possesses Konoha's body, using its immense power to overwhelm Kido, Kano, and Seto, coercing Marry to take their snakes and try to restart the cycle all over again. However, the words of her friends prevents Marry from going through with it. At that moment, Shintarō and Ayano arrive, and with help from another world's Konoha, gives Marry the power to swallow everything. Believing in the future over a fantasy world, Marry overcomes the snake, who is destroyed by Konoha, before having a brief reunion with her mother. The series ends with Shintarō and Ayano in the real world and reuniting with the others.
