= Bandai Channel =

Japanese video streaming service

- Logo used since 2021
- Company type: Division
- Website type: OTT streaming platform
- Founded: March 1, 2002; 24 years ago
- Headquarters: Ogikubo, Suginami, Tokyo, {{{location_country}}}
- Country of origin: Japan
- Owner: Bandai Namco Filmworks
- Key people: Takanori Ajiki (president and representative director)
- Industry: Entertainment; mass media
- Products: Streaming media; video on demand; digital distribution
- Services: Film production; Film distribution; Television production; Television distribution
- Parent: Bandai Namco Filmworks
- Website: www.b-ch.com
- Current status: Active

Bandai Channel (Japanese: バンダイチャンネル, Hepburn: Bandai Chan'neru) is a subscription video on-demand streaming service and anime distributor. It was established on March 1, 2002, by Bandai in coordination with Sunrise, Bandai Visual, and Bandai Networks. Its headquarters is located in Kajicho, Chiyoda, Tokyo.

By October 2003, Bandai Channel had exceeded 3 million paid viewings.
