= A Good Librarian Like a Good Shepherd =

Japanese adult visual novel developed by August, and manga and anime adaptation

- Daitoshokan no Hitsujikai original visual novel cover

大図書館の羊飼い (Daitoshokan no Hitsujikai)
- Genre: Harem, romance, urban fantasy
- Manga
- Daitoshokan no Hitsujikai (May 2012 – January 2015); Daitoshokan no Hitsujikai: The Little Lutra Lutra (July 2012 – June 2013); Daitoshokan no Hitsujikai: Lovely Librarians (September 2012 – October 2014); Daitoshokan no Hitsujikai: Library 4 You (October 2012 – January 2015); Daitoshokan no Hitsujikai: Hitoribotchi no Diva (November 2012 – October 2013)
- Light novel

Daitoshokan no Hitsujikai: Overture
- Written by: Noritake Tao
- Illustrated by: Bekkankō
- Published by: Enterbrain
- Published: August 30, 2012
- Volumes: 1
- Video game
- Developer: August
- Publisher: Hazuki
- Genre: Eroge, Visual novel
- Platform: Windows
- Released: JP: January 25, 2013 (Windows)
- Light novel
- Written by: Noritake Tao
- Illustrated by: Masao Aona
- Published by: Enterbrain
- Original run: January 30, 2013 – April 30, 2013
- Volumes: 2
- Anime television series
- Directed by: Team Nico: Yū Nobuta; Kaori Hayashi; Tomomi Kamiya; Kenichi Konishi; Mami Sodeyama
- Produced by: Masaru Nagai
- Written by: Kiyoko Yoshimura
- Music by: Active Planets
- Studio: Hoods Entertainment; Felix Film
- Licensed by: AUS: Madman Entertainment; NA: Funimation
- Original network: Tokyo MX, AT-X
- English network: US: Funimation
- Original run: October 8, 2014 – December 24, 2014
- Episodes: 12
- Video game

Daitoshokan no Hitsujikai: Library Party
- Developer: ARIA
- Publisher: Kaga Create (formerly), TGL, Inc.
- Genre: Eroge, Visual novel
- Platform: PlayStation Vita, PlayStation 4, Nintendo Switch,
- Released: JP: February 12, 2015 (PS Vita); JP: July 26, 2018 (Switch); JP: February 21, 2019 (PS4)

A Good Librarian Like a Good Shepherd, known in Japan as Daitoshokan no Hitsujikai (Japanese: 大図書館の羊飼い; lit. Large Library's Shepherd or The Shepherd of the Great Library), is a Japanese adult visual novel developed by August and released on January 25, 2013 for Windows as a DVD. The gameplay in Daitoshokan no Hitsujikai follows a branching plot line which offers pre-determined scenarios with courses of interaction, and focuses on the appeal of the five female main characters by the player character. A fan disc for Windows titled Daitoshokan no Hitsujikai: Hōkago Shippo Days was released in August 2013. A second, adult fan disc titled Daitoshokan no Hitsujikai: Dreaming Sheep was released in March 2014. A PlayStation Vita port of the original game and fan discs featuring additional content was released in February 2015.

There have been five manga adaptations based on the game published by ASCII Media Works, Ichijinsha, Kadokawa Shoten and Media Factory. Comic anthologies and light novels were also published, as were several music albums. An anime television series adaptation animated by Hoods Entertainment and Felix Film aired between October and December 2014.

== Gameplay ==
Text in Daitoshokan no Hitsujikai is displayed in a dialog box, here depicting the player character Kyōtarō (center-left) talking with other characters.

Daitoshokan no Hitsujikai is a romance visual novel in which the player assumes the role of Kyōtarō Kakei. Much of its gameplay is spent reading the text that appears on the screen, which represents the story's narrative and dialogue. The text is accompanied by character sprites, which represent who Kyōtarō is talking to, over background art. Throughout the game, the player encounters CG artwork at certain points in the story, which take the place of the background art and character sprites. Daitoshokan no Hitsujikai follows a branching plot line with multiple endings, and depending on the decisions that the player makes during the game, the plot will progress in a specific direction.

There are five main plot lines that the player will have the chance to experience, one for each of the heroines in the story. Throughout gameplay, the player is given multiple options to choose from, and text progression pauses at these points until a choice is made. Some decisions can lead the game to end prematurely and offer an alternative ending to the plot. To view all plot lines in their entirety, the player will have to replay the game multiple times and choose different choices to further the plot to an alternate direction. Throughout gameplay, there are scenes depicting Kyōtarō and a given heroine having sex.

== Plot ==
Set in the vast and prestigious Shiomi Academy (汐美学園, Shiomi Gakuen), Kyōtarō Kakei is a student and the only member of the Library Club (図書部, Tosho-bu). When Kyōtarō was young, he aspired to read all the magic books in the world which were kept in the magic library. He was given a bookmark by a shepherd, which was his entry ticket to access the magic library. He must show kindness and bring happiness to people he encounters. As the sole member of the Library Club, he enjoys the fact that he can read peacefully by himself. After receiving a text from the 'shepherd', which reads his fate is going to change, Kyōtarō encounters a second-year girl named Tsugumi Shirasaki, whom he saves at the train station. Later that day, Tsugumi enters the Library Club, she thanks him, and asks for his help to make Shiomi Academy a more enjoyable place. Like Kyōtarō, Tsugumi has also received a text from the shepherd. With the shepherd's guidance, more students end up joining their group.

== Characters ==
=== Main characters ===
Kyōtarō Kakei (筧 京太郎, Kakei Kyōtarō)
Voiced by: Junji Majima (anime)
Kyōtarō is a second-year student majoring in humanities. He is a bookworm, and is often seen reading a book in public. He was originally the sole member of the Library Club. Kyōtarō likes to help others and is a kind, collected person. He is the object of affection for most of the girls in his club and doesn't seem aware until Tsugumi's confession and noticing the other girl's affections.

Tsugumi Shirasaki (白崎 つぐみ, Shirasaki Tsugumi)
Voiced by: Mako Mishiro (PC), Madoka Yonezawa (anime)
Tsugumi is a girl with long reddish brown hair tied in twintails, whom Kyōtarō encounters at the train station. She later becomes the official leader of the Library Club. She is good at sewing and cooking. Tsugumi makes it her job to make lunch for the others every day. She has feelings for Kyōtarō and confesses to him in episode 10.

Tamamo Sakuraba (桜庭 玉藻, Sakuraba Tamamo)
Voiced by: Sakura Tachibana (PC), Yuka Saitō (anime)
Tamamo is a girl with very long black hair tied into a ponytail, and is Tsugumi's best friend. She becomes a member of the Library Club. She is the type who gets jealous easily. Tamamo is quite independent, as she lives alone in a luxury apartment, and has high practical skills. She develops feelings for Kyōtarō after he helps her overcome a need to work and she sees his kind side.

Senri Misono (御園 千莉, Misono Senri)
Voiced by: Kotono Marui (PC), Nozomi Yamamoto (anime)
Senri is a girl with short, pretty lilac-colored hair. She becomes a member of the Library Club. Most of the time, she is expressionless, and seems to have a cool attitude. Senri is a talented singer, and at one time, she won a national contest. She enjoys crossword puzzles, though she is not necessarily very good at it. She develops feelings for Kyōtarō when he persuades her to make her own path.

Kana Suzuki (鈴木 佳奈, Suzuki Kana)
Voiced by: Sora Haruka (PC), Eri Sendai (anime)
Kana is a girl with long, wavy blonde hair with a white Alice band, and is a member of the Library Club. She has a bright, polite personality. She has a part time job as a waitress. Kana has a mild allergy to cats, so she cannot come into close contact with one. She develops feelings for Kyōtarō after he advises her to truly be herself.

Nagi Kodachi (小太刀 凪, Kodachi Nagi)
Voiced by: Hana Kiritani (PC), Atsumi Tanezaki (anime)
Nagi is a girl with short reddish hair, tied into twintails. She is a member of the Library Committee, not a member of the Library Club. She lives next door to Kyōtarō, making them next door neighbors. It is later revealed that she is Kyōtarō's half-sister, from whom he was separated many years prior; they were born from the same father, but different mothers. Despite initial attempts to impede him on being a Shepherd, she shows that she truly cares for him.

=== Secondary characters ===
Ikkei Takamine (高峰 一景, Takamine Ikkei)
Voiced by: Andalusia (PC), Showtaro Morikubo (anime)
Ikkei is Kyōtarō's classmate and best friend, who joins the Library Club. He used to be part of the karate club, but had to quit because of a foot injury. He is aware that all the girls prefer Kyōtarō and is jealous of it. Nonetheless, he is a good friend to Kyōtarō and is pleased the club has a good effect on him.

Maho Mochizuki (望月 真帆, Mochizuki Maho)
Voiced by: Bouquet Hanataba (PC), Saki Nakajima (anime)
Maho is a girl with long white hair, and is the student council president. She is often trying to get Kyōtarō to join the student council, and is often seen blushing when with him, suggesting that she has feelings for Kyōtarō.

Miyu Serizawa (芹沢 水結, Serizawa Miyu)
Voiced by: Asakura Suzune (PC), Rina Satō (anime) (Note: Rina Sato went under alias Suzune Asakura for the PC game)
Miyu is a girl with long pink hair. She is a member of the broadcasting unit and drama club.

Sayumi Ureshino (嬉野 紗弓実, Ureshino Sayumi)
Voiced by: Yuzu Mamiya (PC), Miyu Kashiwagi (anime)
Sayumi is a short girl with long, light blue hair. She wears a hat at all times, which she slams on the floor whenever she's angry. She is shown to be fond of first-person shooter games.

Aoi Takigawa (多岐川 葵, Takigawa Aoi)
Voiced by: Rino Kawashima (PC), Kei Mizusawa (anime)
Aoi is a girl with long blue hair in a low ponytail. She is the student council vice president.

Sayori Shirasaki (白崎 さより, Shirasaki Sayori)
Voiced by: Motoe Usui (PC), Yō Taichi (anime)
Sayori is the sickly younger sister of Tsugumi. Despite being ill, she has a bright, positive personality, like her sister.

Gizaemon (儀左右衛門)
Voiced by: Itsuki Akiyama (PC), Satoshi Tsuruoka (anime)
Gizaemon or as he is called Giza, is a fat, male cat with a black and white coat. He is seemingly a stray cat that wandered into the school library and is often seen hanging out with the club members. He is particularly close to Takamine who is often seen holding him. He is very perverted, as he likes to poke fun at Kana's small bust and seems interested in well-endowed girls like Kodachi.

Shepherd (羊飼い, Hitsujikai)
The shepherd is well known throughout the school, and is rumored to appear in front of those who are working hard, and grant wishes.

Nanai (ナナイ)
Voiced by: Taiyō Kuroki (PC), Taiten Kusunoki (anime)
Nanai is the man whom Kakei met in his childhood, and was the one who gave him the way to the magic library. In the present day, he is Kodachi's supervisor, and though he initially didn't approve her acts of indirectly forming the library club for Kakei, he comes to see they had a good effect on him. He is later revealed to be the biological father of both Kyōtarō and Kodachi.

=== Hōkago Shippo Days ===
Kei Kirishima (桐島 慶, Kirishima Kei)
The protagonist of the side story, Kei is a cat lover.

Nozomi Toki (土岐 のぞみ, Toki Nozomi)
Voiced by: Yui Kusuhara
Nozomi is a girl with long light pink hair, she is Kei's childhood friend and lives in the same apartment as him.

Sakuya Fujimiya (藤宮 朔夜, Fujimiya Sakuya)
Voiced by: Ōka Kashii
Sakuya is a girl with long brown hair, and is also a childhood friend of Kei's. She has a very straightforward and honest personality. Sakuya is good when it comes to housework.

== Development and release ==
Daitoshokan no Hitsujikai is the ninth title developed by the visual novel developer August, after their previous titles such as Fortune Arterial and Aiyoku no Eustia. The project was overseen by game director Rune, and the scenario was written by three people: Taku Sakakibara, Hiroyuki Uchida, and Hideaki Anzai. Character design and art direction for the game was provided by Bekkankō, and CG supervision was handled by Michi. The game's background music was produced by members of Active Planets. Daitoshokan no Hitsujikai was released on January 25, 2013 as a DVD for Windows as a limited-edition version. The regular edition was released on January 31, 2014. A fan disc for Windows titled Daitoshokan no Hitsujikai: Hōkago Shippo Days (大図書館の羊飼い～放課後しっぽデイズ～; lit. After School Tail Days), rated for ages 15 and older, was initially sold at Comiket 84 on August 10, 2013 and later for general sale on January 31, 2014. An adult fan disc for Windows titled Daitoshokan no Hitsujikai: Dreaming Sheep (大図書館の羊飼い -Dreaming Sheep-) was released on March 28, 2014. A PlayStation Vita port of the original Windows game and the two fan discs under the title Daitoshokan no Hitsujikai: Library Party was released on February 15, 2015. The port also contains additional content, such as the addition of a new heroine.

== Adaptations ==
=== Print media ===
A manga adaptation, titled Daitoshokan no Hitsujikai and illustrated by Akane Sasaki, began serialization in the May 2012 issue of ASCII Media Works' Dengeki G's Magazine. The manga ended serialization in the magazine's May 2014 issue and continued serialization in Dengeki G's Comic between the June 2014 and January 2015 issues. The first volume of Daitoshokan no Hitsujikai was released on November 27, 2012; two volumes have been released as of July 27, 2013. A second manga, titled Daitoshokan no Hitsujikai: The Little Lutra Lutra and illustrated by Shiroi Kusaka, was serialized between the July 2012 and June 2013 issues of Kadokawa Shoten's Comptiq. Two volumes of The Little Lutra Lutra were released between December 26, 2012 and June 6, 2013.

A third manga, titled Daitoshokan no Hitsujikai: Lovely Librarians and illustrated by Rico, began serialization in the September 2012 issue of ASCII Media Works' Dengeki Hime. The first volume of Lovely Librarians was released on March 15, 2013; two volumes have been released as of December 12, 2013. A fourth manga, titled Daitoshokan no Hitsujikai: Library 4 You and illustrated by Wasabi, began serialization in the October 2012 issue of Ichijinsha's Manga 4-koma Palette. The first volume of Library 4 You was released on July 22, 2013. A fifth manga, titled Daitoshokan no Hitsujikai: Hitoribotchi no Diva (ひとりぼっちの歌姫（ディーヴァ）, Hitoribotchi no Dīva; Lonely Diva) and illustrated by Norio Tsukudani, was serialized between the November 2012 and October 2013 issues of Media Factory's Monthly Comic Alive. Two volumes of Hitoribotchi no Diva were released between February 23 and October 23, 2013. Ichijinsha published two volumes of a manga anthology illustrated by various artists titled Daitoshokan no Hitsujikai: Comic Anthology between April 25 and June 25, 2013.

A 56-page "super prelude" book for Daitoshokan no Hitsujikai was published by Enterbrain on July 27, 2012. A light novel titled Daitoshokan no Hitsujikai: Overture, written by Noritake Tao and illustrated by Bekkankō, was published by Enterbrain on August 30, 2012. A 63-page Daitoshokan no Hitsujikai heroine profile book was published by Kadokawa Shoten on December 20, 2012. Enterbrain published two volumes of a light novel series adaptation of Daitoshokan no Hitsujikai, written by Noritake Tao and illustrated by Masao Aona, with cover illustrations by Bekkankō, between January 30 and April 30, 2013. Enterbrain also published a 320-page visual fan book on June 28, 2013, consisting of detailed story explanations, character introductions, rough illustrations, stage commentaries and interviews from the staff and cast.

=== Anime ===
An anime television series adaptation animated by Hoods Entertainment and Felix Film aired in Japan between October 8 and December 24, 2014. An original video animation episode was bundled with the first DVD and Blu-ray compilation volumes released on December 25, 2014. The direction, character design and animation direction is shared by five people under the collective name Team Nico: Ken'ichi Konishi, Tomomi Kamiya, Asami Sodeyama, Kaori Hayashi and Yū Nobuta. The screenplay is written by Kiyoko Yoshimura and the music is produced by Active Planets. The anime has been licensed for streaming in North America by Funimation, and was released on Blu-ray and DVD on July 12, 2016.

==== Episode list ====
No.	Title	Directed by	Written by	Original release date
1	"Formation of the Library Club"; Transliteration: "Tosho-bu Kessei" (Japanese: 図書部結成)	Yū Nobuta; Tomomi Kamiya	Kiyoko Yoshimura	October 8, 2014
In a scene (that seems to be in the past), a boy is approached by a man who tells him about magic book that can only be found in magic library. Boy is given a ticket to the library but he can only enter the library when certain conditions are met. (At present) After receiving a text from the "Shepherd", Kakei gets has a sudden intuition that the girl he saw handing out posters is in danger and runs back to pull her out of the way, however they trip and Kakei accidentally gropes her breast, resulting in the news spreading that he is a molester. Kakei and the girl, Tsugumi Shirasaki, are in the same class. Later, Kakei is sought out by Tamamo Sakuraba, a friend of Tsugumi. Tamamo confronts him about the molesting incident, and chases after him. Eventually the misunderstanding resolved when Tsugumi blurts out (directed by Ikkei Takamine, friend of Kakei) that she was not unwilling. Kakei brings Tsugumi, Tamamo and Ikkei to the Library club. Tsugumi asks him to join her project: "Shiomi Happy Project". Although the student council president, Maho Mochizuki, objects, he agrees join until Golden Week along with Ikkei, and Tamamo who is already a member. The four members get a mysterious congratulatory text from the shepherd just before getting yelled by a library girl for being noisy. Episodes ends with the library girl and a man (from first scene) on roof top, revealing that Kyotaro is a candidate for being the next Shepherd.
2	"Lost and Found"; Transliteration: "Otoshimono Todokemono" (Japanese: 落としもの届けもの)	Hiroya Saitō	Kiyoko Yoshimura	October 15, 2014
A girl with tuning fork is shown singing on the bridge while reminiscing her past. At the library, Kyotaro feels hesitant to give away his peaceful room and time to others. Later, the club members pick up the trash around the school area to make their name known. Suzuki Kana from school cafeteria, Appllio, agrees to take part in the activity. Kyotaro helps the girl (previously seen on the bridge), Senri Misono, to get 500-yen coin stuck under the vending machine. While leaving, she drops her tuning fork only to be later found by Kyotaro. It is also revealed that encounter of Suzuki and Senri was all plan of Shepherd’s candidate girl. Tsugumi and Kyotaro decide to return the lost item to Senri. While going home, Kyotaro meets Suzuki and helps her pick a new phone. Next day, when Suzuki decides to join the club, all the club members get another mail from the Shepherd stating that Senri Misono will teach them something important.
3	"Lonely Song Princess"; Transliteration: "Hitoribotchi no Utahime" (Japanese: ひとりぼっちの歌姫)	Tomomi Kamiya	Keiichirō Ōchi	October 22, 2014
Library club decides to split up to investigate the sender of the emails, with the help of Ureshino from Appllio school cafeteria, who is good at computers, and meet Senri at the same time. Ureshino agrees to investigate the emails but in return Kyotaro must pass out the flyers for Appllio Spring Fair wearing costumes. Club members couldn’t talk about the emails with Senri due to tense atmosphere around her. In library room, when Tsugumi had Kyotaro take off his shirt to take measurement for his costumes, the library girl suddenly walks in and gets the wrong idea about them. The library girl introduces herself as Nagi Kodachi and been living next door to Kyotaro all this time. Tsugumi makes pillows for everyone with analogical animal figure embroidered on them. Senri gets fever by being in rain. She sends an email to Tsugumi to help her to which Tsugumi quickly reacts and goes to her room with other. Tsugumi and Tamamo decides to stay at Senri, while other return. Kyotaro has a dream, reminiscing his past, where someone asks him not to leave. Kyotaro clears up the misunderstanding about incident at library room to Nagi. Later they find that Senri had also received mail from the Shepherd. They get address of the sender of the mails from Ureshino, but when they visit the place, to their surprise, the place is completely deserted.
4	"A New Library Club"; Transliteration: "Shinsei Tosho-bu" (Japanese: 新生図書部)	Yoshihisa Iida	Teruko Utsumi	October 29, 2014
A scene shows one of Kyotaro’s childhood birthday party which he wasn’t interested in anyway. In school, Ureshino has all club members pass out the flyers in costumes. Kyotaro, however, has to wear maid’s outfit instead of butlers. Suzuki expresses her contentment for being in the club while she puts make-up on Kyotaro. Senri visit the caferteria to thank Tsugumi for taking care of her while she was sick, but she ends up getting angry when Tsugumi calls her ‘Song Princess’. Kyotaro later clears up the misunderstanding and Senri joins in to pass out the flyers. Senri later joins the club. Tsugumi gives her a pillow as well, that has a cat and musical note embroidered in it, taking into consideration of her fondness to cats and music. Later, everyone goes to bathhouse as the hot water system at girls’ dormitory got broken. In bathhouse, Nagi intentionally gives false hints to girls of having an affair with Kyotaro, to make them jealous, and get them closer to Kyotaro. Tsugumi reveals to Kyotaro that she has a bedridden sister in hospital, and to whom Tsugumi lied about having many friends and enrolled in club activities. She wants to make all those lies true by the time her sister returns. Next day, everyone celebrates Kyotaro’s birthday, which he feels, the very first one anyone had celebrated for him from heart. So, he decides to stay in Happy Project even after the Golden Week. Later at night, Kyotaro sends text to the Shepherd asking him to meet him. He immediately gets a reply which says Kyotaro already know him.
5	"The Truth Behind the Messages"; Transliteration: "Mēru no Shinjitsu" (Japanese: メールの真実)	Tomoyoshi Tsuchiya; Matsuo Asami	Ayuna Fujisaki	November 5, 2014
Club members heads to ramen shop after cleaning the pool, where they discuss about their rising popularity in school along with more work requests. Hearing about more work brings Ikkei to dismay, but Tamamo is more energetic than ever. People gathering in library room creates problem to the club and is asked by head library worker to move club room somewhere else. Decision is kept on hold after club members agrees to clean up the grass around the school, and Tamamo brings out planned administrative solution for activities. Kyotaro and Ikkei realizes Tamamo is working too hard by herself for the club. So, Kyotaro approaches her and ask her to relax a bit more. Nagi meets the man who informs her of Kyotaro passing the preliminary exam for being the Shepherd and warns her not to unnecessary emails, to which Nagi detest and shows her desire to become the next Shepherd. Nagi visits Kyotaro to check whether he has really passed the exam, to which she confirms to be true when he has a vision of an invisible wall. Upon asking about the Shepherd, Kyotaro suspects that former has an ability to erase someone’s memory. Nagi keeps giving false hints about her and Kyotaro’s relationship to other girls. In the evening, when Tamomo calls Kyotaro to talk about the next week’s schedule, latter hears Nagi’s voice on the phone and room next door at the same time. He finds it weird and barges into Nagi’s room only to find that Nagi is the Shepherd and he is about to be taken to the magic library by the strange man (from previous scenes).
6	"The Magic Library"; Transliteration: "Mahō no Toshokan" (Japanese: 魔法の図書館)	Miwa Sasaki	Kiyoko Yoshimura	November 12, 2014
The strange man reveals himself as Nagi Kodachi’s supervisor, Nanai, a Shepherd number 771. Kyotaro is then taken to the magic library where he finds infinite numbers of books in which everything about everyone in the world is written. But at his point right now, he is only able to read his own book. It is revealed that he has power to fly to the magic library, which led him having premonitions of the future, but only those involves him, since he can only read one book. Nanai invites Kyotaro to become Shepherd trainee, to which Kyotaro asks some time to think about. Nagi resents the idea of Kyotaro being a Shepherd as she wants to become one herself. In school, as per request, Kyotaro and Senri has to find a lost lizard, where Senri gets scolded by Miyu Serizawa for skipping her special singing lessons. Senri runs off, and asks Kyotaro to go somewhere fun together. Nagi intervenes and takes away Kyotaro, again giving suggestive false hints. From a magical book, Kyotaro finds that Ureshino is about to get serious injury on her left hand. Nagi tries to prevent the incident by following instructions written in the book. Kyotaro has a vision that incident is still not prevented before Nagi realizing that she messed up something. Kyotaro quickly acts up and puts up a stupid act. Startled Ureshino stops walking. After a second or two, freezer storage’s shuts hard, thus preventing the accident. Kyotaro asks Nagi to be more careful next time to which Nagi agrees to comply. On the way to club room, Kyotaro thinks the loneliness and isolation in his childhood was so that he could become a neutral Shepherd in future. In the club room, Tsugumi tries to confess her feeling for Kyotaro but fails. Later Nagi tells members that their Happy Project activities has been recognized by the general library. However, in the student council room, a member Takigawa, seems to be plotting something against the Library Club.
7	"The Library Club's Day Off"; Transliteration: "Tosho-bu no Kyūjitsu" (Japanese: 図書部の休日)	Hiroshi Akiyama	Keiichirō Ōchi	November 19, 2014
In the clubroom, there is a discussion on Kyotaro’s preference on girls where everyone makes suggestion of themselves. When they can’t conclude anything, Tsugumi asks Kyotaro to go on a date with everyone. But on the day of date, Kyotaro wakes up late and all girls end up in his house. Nagi finds out about the plans and joins in. Everyone helps Tamamo choose her a dress. Tamamo seems to have everything scheduled but forgot to make reservation in restaurant. Kyotaro covers for her, and suggests to go in another store. Nagi and Senri plays a game where Senri ends up twisting her leg. While getting lone time with Kyotaro, Senri teases him a bit. In a bookstore, Kyotaro and Suzuki have conversation about the books they like. Later, Nagi predicts a future of a man encountering Tsugumi and falling for her. After getting rejected, he would be making love dolls, name them after Tsugumi and make them known to the world. To prevent such embarrassing future, Kyotaro acts as Tsugumi’s lover in front of that man. Everyone demands explanation for Kyotaro’s actions. Nagi defends Kyotaro by asking if they were hiding something from Kyotaro instead. They show him anonymous message that asks about Kyotaro’s preference on girls. While discussing about message, Kyotaro realizes other members keep forgetting about the Shepherd. Kyotaro confronts Nagi on this matter and knows that if he were to become a Shepherd, everyone’s memories of him will disappear as well. He also hears about Nagi’s resolve to give up everything to become a Shepherd and guide the world to a better place. But when Kyotaro reminds her that he will also forget her, she gets emotional.
8	"The Magic Book"; Transliteration: "Mahō no Hon" (Japanese: 魔法の本)	Norihiko Nagahama	Teruko Utsumi	November 26, 2014
Kyotaro is helping Suzuki in writing script for a beach event which she doubts it to go well. The plot is about the Queen’s New Clothes where queen and other are fooled into wearing invisible clothes that can only be seen by the wise. The show is ruined when Kyotaro accidentally pulls off Tamomo’s bra. Later, Kyotaro and Senri consoles Suzuki and tells her that she did well. Unofficial clubs also want to present their performance in upcoming Shiori Festival, but vice president of student council, Takigawa declines by showing security issues in increasing the number of stages. Suzuki starts acting strangely. Kyotaro and Tsugumi tries to ask her about it but fails. Suzuki is not coming to club anymore. Tsugumi asks Suzuki on writing another script for the event to make her happy. Tamamo tells Kyotaro about a strange email from the Shepherd that says the Shepherd had decided to eliminate the Library Club. Nagi denies to have sent that image. Kyotaro goes to meet Suzuki on Nagi’s suggestion. Suzuki tells him about how her friend and group betrayed her before meeting Kyotaro, and is scared that things will end up same. But Kyotaro tells her to be herself and still accept her as she is. Later, Senri’s music teacher asks to leave the Library Club immediately and attend her music lessons.
9	"The Song Princess' Choice"; Transliteration: "Utahime no Sentaku" (Japanese: 歌姫の選択)	Shigeyasu Yamauchi	Ayuna Fujisaki	December 3, 2014
Senri refuses to attend extra lessons upfront. Tamamo speaks in support of teacher which makes Senri sad and leave the room. Kyotaro tries to follow her, but Nagi stops him telling him, its Shepherd’s job from this time forward since she might quit singing forever. But Kyotaro refuses to leave things as it is. Senri tells him about her past, when she didn’t give her best in a singing competition for her friend to win, but she still won and got nicknamed ‘Song Princess’. This made her friend angry and leave her. Kyotaro suggests her to stop singing if it’s too painful for her. Everyone is worried about this but Kyotaro asks them to leave the matter to him. Takigawa is so obsessed with Mochizuki that she has been secretly taking pictures of her. Tsugumi with help of her sister, suggests a name ‘Minafes’, for the event conducting by Library Club to which everyone agrees upon. Suzuki comforts Senri telling her, doing what she wants, is right. Tamomo, on the other hand, wants to support Senri in becoming a singer, as Tamomo could not become an artist herself due to her parents’ disapproval. Tamamo gets another mail from the Shepherd telling them to stop (their activities). When Miyu Serizawa, Senri’s childhood friend, asks Kyotaro about Senri’s quitting singing, Kyotaro confirms it and asks Miyu to think what would happen to Senri next by herself. Nagi tries to get Kyotaro to do something about the current situation with Senri, but Kyotaro refuses to make hasty decisions, and asks to observe her longer. Nanai appears out of nowhere and tells Kyotaro that he has passed second exam, and can start becoming Shepherd whenever he wants. Nanai takes him to magic library, where he finds Nagi’s book which is currently sealed. If Nagi fails to become the Shepherd and the book will be unsealed and she will have to return to her normal life. After reading the book, Kyotaro remembers Nagi to be his younger sister.
10	"Confession"; Transliteration: "Kokuhaku" (Japanese: 告白)	Taiki Nishimura	Keiichirō Ōchi	December 10, 2014
Nagi moves into Kyotaro’s room giving being siblings as an excuse. Kyotaro remembers his past when his father had many wives and Nagi was introduced to him as his half-sister. Nagi was always alone and neglected by everyone. The house servants found out about this and tried abuse her but Kyotaro stopped them. Suzuki stays a night over at Senri’s to watch movies. Nagi goes to the take bath, just when Tsugumi visits Kyotaro to propose him. Later, it is revealed that Tsugumi had lied her sister, Sayori about Kyotaro being her boyfriend, but Sayori had known about everything from the very beginning. In other to thank Kyotaro for visiting her sister, Tsugumi offers to cook dinner for him which puts him tight spot, as he does not want Tsugumi learn about Nagi living with him. Kyotaro has a hard time hiding Nagi’s stuff scattered around his room. Later, Tsugumi and Sayori visit Kyotaro and find Nagi in the room. Sayori can’t calm down when Tsugumi accepts this quietly. Sayori gets heart stroke and Nagi has to use her magic to get her to hospital. Kyotaro explains that he and Nagi are the Shepherd trainee and will be soon forgotten by everyone. Tsugumi confesses her feeling and asks Kyotaro not to leave. The next day, Library Club is taken over by previous senior club members who ask Kyotaro and other members to leave.
11	"Decision"; Transliteration: "Ketsui" (Japanese: 決意)	Kazuma Fujimori	Kiyoko Yoshimura	December 17, 2014
Kyotaro and his friends are forced to leave the clubroom. They find out that Takigawa was behind it and she did it under the influence of the Shepherd. But they refuse to give just because their clubroom was taken and get determined to make Minafes a success. The school council announces time for a symposium which matches to that of Minafes. Many famous celebrities are to be attending this symposium. This makes students return their tickets for Minafes. Kyotaro has a vision of Tsugumi dying in Minafes and decides to become the Shepherd to save her. Nanai burns Kyotaro’s book from magic library making him slowly disappear from others’ memories. Tsugumi rushes to Kyotaro’s place when she can’t remember her conversations with Kyotaro. Kyotaro admits it was because he had become a Shepherd. Tsugumi tells him she would hate Kyotaro becoming a Shepherd, but Kyotaro refuses to change his decision. Everyone receives a message that Kyotaro has joined student council to make Minafes as an official school event, so they try to stop him. Kyotaro explains this to be fake. Senri decides to sing in Minafes and Nagi makes this news it go viral. On the request of Nagi, Miyu also accepts to become MC for Minafes. Kyotaro on the other hand can’t seem to find any way to save Tsugumi from accident.
12	"A Good Librarian Like a Good Shepherd"; Transliteration: "Daitoshokan no Hitsujikai" (Japanese: 大図書館の羊飼い)	Yū Nobuta; Matsuo Asami	Kiyoko Yoshimura	December 24, 2014
A huge crowd gathers at Minafes. Appllio staff and Happy Project members are determined to give their best. Performances in Minafes begins and audience seems to like them all. When it was time to perform a drama, Tsugumi goes to find Kyotaro, Kyotaro and Nagi catches Takigawa messing with screws of hanging lights. When Tsugumi reaches at the scene, the lights fall. Seeing no other options, Kyotaro uses his Shepherd magic, to transport the lights along with Takigawa, Nagi and himself to symposium where Takigawa unknowingly confesses before Mochizuki and everyone in there. Since, it is against the Shepherd’s rule to expose their power to normal people, Kyotaro now can’t become a Shepherd. But, since his book is already erased, he can’t have a normal life either, and will be forgotten by all. Kyotaro is missing in Minafes and everyone searches for him. Tsugumi gives a speech where she tells they can accomplish many things if everyone lends their hand to each other (and with word play – asks to be with Kyotaro). On Tsugumi’s request, Kyotaro decides to stay with the group. Without Kyotaro’s knowledge, Nanai brings back Kyotaro’s book. Takigawa returns the clubroom and apologizes to everyone. In hospital, Sayori shows desire to become a Shepherd, while a man observes her from behind. Nagi is made the Shepherd in charge of Shiomi Academy and is going to be living with Kyotaro.

== Music ==
Daitoshokan no Hitsujikai has nine pieces of theme music: two opening themes, two ending themes, and five insert songs. The first opening theme is "Straight Sheep" (ストレイトシープ) by Ceui, and the second opening theme is "Yume Kai Biyori" (夢飼い日和) by Hagumi Nishizawa. The sub ending theme is "Dear Smile" by Ceui and the main ending theme is "Ashita e no Shiori" (明日への栞) by Nishizawa. The insert songs are credited to the five heroines: "Natural Garden" (ナチュラルガーデン) by Tsugumi Shirasaki, "Sazanami Tsubaki" (さざなみ椿) by Tamamo Sakuraba, "Yozora no Stairs" (夜空のステアーズ) by Senri Misono, "Kimi dake no Day Star" (君だけのDay Star) by Kana Suzuki, and "Michite, Hiite" (みちて、ひいて) by Nagi Kodachi. The opening theme for Daitoshokan no Hitsujikai: Dreaming Sheep is "Dreaming Sheep" (ドリーミングシープ) by Mitsuki Nakae. The first ending theme is "Hitsujikumo no Sora ni" (ひつじ雲の空に), also by Mitsuki, and the second ending theme is "Sacrament" (サクラメント) by Wagumi Nishizawa.

The single for "Straight Sheep", which also contains "Yume Kai Biyori", was released on August 24, 2012. The single for "Ashita e no Shiori", which also contains "Dear Smile", was released on January 25, 2013. An image song album titled Daitoshokan no Hitsujikai: Vocal Collection was released on March 29, 2013. The game's original soundtrack was released on May 24, 2013 in a three-disc collection containing 41 tracks.

The anime has two pieces of theme music. The opening theme song is "On my Sheep" by Mitsuki Nakae, and the ending theme song is "Aozora to Green Belt" (青空とグリーンベルト) by Hagumi Nishizawa.

== Reception ==
In 2012, Daitoshokan no Hitsujikai ranked four times in the top ten in national PC game pre-orders in Japan. The rankings were at No. 4 in September, No. 3 in October, and twice at No. 2 in November and December. Daitoshokan no Hitsujikai ranked first in terms of national sales of PC games in Japan in January 2013. Daitoshokan no Hitsujikai was No. 1 in the 2013 sales ranking on Getchu.com, a major redistributor of visual novel and domestic anime products. The game maintained first place in sales ranking for the month of its release, and in February the ranking dropped down to No. 11. The fan disc, Daitoshokan no Hitsujikai: Dreaming Sheep, ranked at No. 1 in sales for March 2014. In April 2014, Dreaming Sheep's ranking in sales dropped down to No. 20.

In January 2013, Daitoshokan no Hitsujikai was voted No. 1 in Getchu's Bishōjo Game Awards as the best game of the month. It was voted as the best overall title of 2013, and ranked fourth in the vote results for the best scenario. Daitoshokan no Hitsujikai has also been ranked third in the 2013 game ranking for system, third in the 2013 game ranking for graphics, first place in the 2013 game ranking for music, and second in the 2013 game ranking for best movie. In the 2013 character poll held on Getchu, Suzuki Kana was voted No. 2, Kodachi Nagi at No. 12, and Ureshino Sayumi at No. 20.
