= Kindergarten Wars =

Japanese manga series

- First tankōbon volume cover, featuring Rita

幼稚園WARS (Yōchien Wars)
- Genre: Action; Romantic comedy
- Manga
- Written by: You Chiba
- Published by: Shueisha
- English publisher: NA: Yen Press
- Imprint: Jump Comics+
- Magazine: Shōnen Jump+
- Original run: September 15, 2022 – present
- Volumes: 18
- Anime television series
- Directed by: Shinsuke Gomi
- Studio: Sunrise; Felix Film
- Licensed by: SEA: Muse Communication
- Original run: April 2027 – scheduled
- icon

Kindergarten Wars (Japanese: 幼稚園WARS, Hepburn: Yōchien Wars) is a Japanese web manga series written and illustrated by You Chiba. It began serialization on Shueisha's Shōnen Jump+ app and website in September 2022. Its chapters have been collected in 18 tankōbon volumes as of August 2026. An anime television series adaptation produced by Sunrise and Felix Film is set to premiere in April 2027.

== Plot ==
The story takes place in Kindergarten Noir (ブラック幼稚園, Burakku Yōchien), known as "the world's safest kindergarten". Hosting the children of politicians, celebrities, businessmen, and other VIPs, Kindergarten Noir protects them from would-be assassins and kidnappers by employing former criminals as teachers in exchange for reduced sentences. Rita, also known as Convict #999, is a former assassin who finds herself working at Kindergarten Noir—both to get a reduced sentence by acting as a bodyguard and to find a hot guy along the way.

== Characters ==
=== Kindergarten Noir ===
Rita (リタ)
Voiced by: Atsumi Tanezaki
A 20-year old Dutch assassin known as "The Witch" who takes on a new identity as a kindergarten teacher to protect the children of world leaders at a school called Kindergarten Noir. Rita has a running gag where she falls in love at first sight with an assassin trying to harm the children, and asks them a series of questions, and if they answer them with a response Rita doesn't like they would get shot.
Doug (ダグ, Dagu)
Voiced by: Kentarō Kumagai
A 23-year old womanizing American swindler from Nevada who accepted the job of working in the kindergarten. He develops feelings for Rita early on.
Hana Bradley (ハナ・ブラッドリー, Hana Buraddorī)
Voiced by: Hitomi Ōwada
Luke Smith (ルーク・スミス, Rūku Sumisu)
Voiced by: Satoshi Hino
Silvia Scott (シルビア・スコット, Shirubia Sukotto)
Voiced by: Mariya Ise
Erina Winkler (エリナ・ウィンクラー, Erina Winkurā)
Gordon Z. Sky (ゴードン・Z(ゼット)・スカイ, Gōdon Zetto Sukai)
Voiced by: Tetsu Inada
Mac Freeman (マック・フリーマン, Makku Furīman)
Voiced by: Mirei Kumagai
Una Mauri (宇奈(ウーナ)舞里(マウリ), Ūna Mauri)
Voiced by: Sumire Morohoshi
Natsuki Inomoto (猪(いの)本(もと)ナツキ, Inomoto Natsuki)
Yoshiteru Ikeda (池(いけ)田(だ)ヨシテル, Ikeda Yoshiteru)
Louis Fiore (ルイ・フィオーレ, Rui Fiōre)
Lyla (ライラ, Raira)

Additionally, Kindergarten Noir utilizes a group of ten super-strong poodles who perfectly understand human language, possess razor-sharp teeth, and can track criminals by sniffing out the scent of their blood. The names of these ten poodles are Shoyu (醤油, Shōyu), Miso (味噌, Miso), Salt (塩, Shio), Chili (坦々, Tantan), Creamy (白湯, Sayu), Pork (豚骨, Tonkotsu), Fish (魚介, Gyokai), Fatty (背脂, Seabura), Hearty (家系, Kakei), and Chicken (鶏ガラ, Niwatori gara).

=== New World Order ===
Henri de Lusé (アンリ・ド・ルゼ, Anri Do Ruze)
Leo (レオ, Reo)
Ashley (アシュリー, Ashurī)
Aoba Niwa (丹(に)羽(わ)アオバ, Niwa Aoba)
Anita Bradley (アニタ・ブラッドリー, Anita Buraddorī)
Van Blackwood (ヴァン・ブラックウッド, Van Burakkūddo)
Spinach Pettersson (スピナッチ・ペッテルソン, Supinacchi Petteruson)
Lulu (ルル, Ruru)

=== Others ===
Shaw Bradley (ショウ・ブラッドリー, Shō Buraddorī)
Harry Bradley (ハリー・ブラッドリー, Harī Buraddorī)
Natasha (ナターシャ, Natāsha)
Haruo Inomoto (猪(いの)本(もと)ハルオ, Inomoto Haruo)
Elza Auger (エルザ・オージェ, Eruza Ōje)
Oliver Austin (オリバー・オースティン, Oribā Ōsutin)
Tina Roberts (ティナ・ロバーツ, Tina Robātsu)
Choran Wan (王(ワン)張(チョウ)蘭(ラン), Wan Chōran)
Hiromi Maruko (丸子(まるこ)ヒロミ, Maruko Hiromi)
Lyla Clark (ライラ・クラーク, Raira Kurāku)
Kei (ケイ)
Eddie Fiore (エディ・フィオーレ, Edi Fiōre)
Louis's father, who was a clergyman and an assassin. He was killed after failing a mission.
Maria Croce (マリア・クローチェ, Maria Kurōche)
Tapio Mäkinen (タピオ・マキネン, Tapio Makinen)
Jukka Mäkinen (ユッカ・マキネン, Yukka Makinen)

== Media ==
=== Manga ===
Written and illustrated by You Chiba, the series began serialization on Shueisha's Shōnen Jump+ app and website on September 15, 2022. Initially starting publication in Jump+'s Rookies program as an "independent manga", in March 2023 Shueisha announced that it would become a full-fledged series. The series reached its final arc after a two-month break on March 27, 2025. As of August 2026, the series' 129 individual chapters have been collected in 18 tankōbon volumes.

Shueisha's Manga Plus platform is publishing the series in English. At New York Comic Con 2024, Yen Press announced that they licensed the series for English print publication.

==== Volumes ====
No.	Original release date	Original ISBN	English release date	English ISBN
1	March 3, 2023	978-4-08-883486-3	May 27, 2025	979-8-8554-0908-6
01. "The Dark-Haired Type" (黒髪イケメン, Kurokami Ikemen); 02. "The Blond Type" (金髪イケメン, Kinpatsu Ikemen); 03. "Doug" (ダグ, Dagu); 04. "No Hot Guys" (イケメンなし, Ikemen Nashi); 05. "New Recruit" (新入社員, Shin'nyū Shain); 06. "Hana" (ハナ); 07. "The Bradley Family" (ブラッドリー一家, Buraddorī Ikka)
2	April 4, 2023	978-4-08-883488-7	September 23, 2025	979-8-8554-0910-9
08. "Brother and Sister" (兄と妹, Ani to Imōto); 09. "The Witch" (魔女, Majo); 10. "Just Fine" (大丈夫, Daijōbu); 11. "Gordon" (ゴードン, Gōdon); 12. "Luke" (ルーク, Rūku); 13. "Trio" (3人, 3-Ri); 14. "Evil" (悪, Waru); 15. "Natasha" (ナターシャ, Natāsha)
3	May 2, 2023	978-4-08-883506-8	January 20, 2026	979-8-8554-0912-3
16. "A Toy That Won't Break" (壊れないおもちゃ, Kowarenai Omocha); 17. "I Just Want to Be Loved" (愛されたいだけ, Aisaretai Dake); 18. "Fun" (楽しい, Tanoshī); 19. "Alone" (ひとりぼっち, Hitori Botchi); 20. "War" (戦争, Sensō); 21. "The Tanned Type" (褐色イケメン, Kasshoku Ikemen)
4	July 4, 2023	978-4-08-883541-9	April 28, 2026	979-8-8554-0914-7
22. "Shall We Dance?" (踊りましょう, Odorimashou); 23. "Dismissal Time" (さよならのお時間, Sayonara no o Jikan); 24. "Teamwork" (チームワーク, Chīmuwāku); 25. "Space" (宇宙, Uchū); 26. "Kiss" (キス, Kisu); 27. "Keep Calm" (冷静, Reisei); 28. "Side Hustle" (副業, Fukugyō); 29. "Goldfish Shop" (金魚屋, Kingyo-ya)
5	September 4, 2023	978-4-08-883640-9	October 27, 2026	979-8-8554-0916-1
30. "Scooping Specialist" (ポイ使い, Poi Tsukai); 31. "Best Brother Bragging Barrage" (お兄ちゃん自慢爆弾大会, O Nīchan Jiman Bakudan Taikai); 32. "Fair and Square" (真剣勝負, Shinken Shōbu); 33. "Natsuki" (ナツキ); 34. "Free" (自由, Jiyū); 35. "Minejima" (ミネジマ); 36. "Fated One" (運命の人, Unmei no Hito)
6	November 2, 2023	978-4-08-883702-4	March 23, 2027	979-8-8554-0918-5
37. "Rain" (雨, Ame); 38. "Burn Scars" (火傷痕, Hi Kizuato); 39. "Lonely" (さみしい, Samishī); 40. "Proof" (証明, Shōmei); 41. "Ex-Girlfriend" (元カノ, Moto Kano); 42. "A Battle to One-up the Ex-Girlfriend" (元カノマウントバトル大会, Moto Kanomaunto Batoru Taikai); 43. "Lullaby" (子守唄, Komori-uta); 44. "Assassins" (刺客, Shikaku)
7	January 4, 2024	978-4-08-883842-7	—	—
45. "The Cute Butler Type" (かわいい系執事イケメン, Kawaī Kei Shitsuji Ikemen); 46. "Vacuum Robot User" (掃除ロボ使い, Sōji Robo Tsukai); 47. "Five Sisters" (5姉妹, 5-Shimai); 48. "A Presentation on Why Shojo Manga Is the Greatest" (少女マンガ最強プレゼンテーション, Shōjo Manga Saikyō Purezentēshon); 49. "Tough" (タフ, Tafu); 50. "Tracy" (トレイシー, Toreishī); 51. "Killers" (人殺し, Hitogoroshi); 52. "New Recruit No. 2" (新入社員その 2, Shin'nyū Shain Sono 2)
8	March 4, 2024	978-4-08-883860-1	—	—
53. "Understood" (わかった, Wakatta); 54. "Let's Go Back" (戻りましょう, Modorimashou); 55. "Senpai Style" (先輩風, Senpai-fū); 56. "Pizza Party" (ピザパーティ, Piza Pāti); 57. "Lyla" (ライラ, Raira); 58. "Aoba" (アオバ, Aoba); 59. "Only" (ただ, Tada)
9	May 2, 2024	978-4-08-884034-5	—	—
60. "Reminiscence" (追憶, Tsuioku); 61. "Love at First Sight" (一目惚れ, Hitomebore); 62. "I Don't Know" (わからない, Wakaranai); 63. "Mouse Paradise" (ネズミの楽園, Nezumi no Rakuen); 64. "Don't Cry" (泣きやんで, Nakiyan de); 65. "Hero" (ヒーロー, Hīrō); 66. "Ruthless" (無情, Mujō); 67. "I Want to Live" (生きたい, Ikitai)
10	July 4, 2024	978-4-08-884091-8	—	—
68. "At the Very Least" (せめて, Semete); 69. "For You" (あなたに, Anata ni); 70. "Ordinary" (普通, Futsū); 71. "The Brash Bad Boy Type" (不良系オラオライケメン, Furyōkei Ora Ora Ikemen); 72. "Delightful☆Dress-Up Time" (ドキドキ☆お着替えタイム, Dokidoki☆Okigae Taimu); 73. "Uproar" (大騒ぎ, Ōsawagi); 74. "Lookin' Forward to Working with Y'All" (そこんとこよろしく, Sokon Toko Yoroshiku)
11	September 4, 2024	978-4-08-884186-1	—	—
75. "Yoshiteru" (ヨシテル, Yoshiteru); 76. "Green Gang" (緑幇, Ryūban); 77. "Brute-Force Strategy" (脳筋作戦, Nōkin Sakusen); 78. "Thrilling☆Torture Time" (ドキドキ☆拷問タイム, Dokidoki☆Gōmon Taimu); 79. "Take Two" (2回目, Ni Kaime); 80. "Long Time No See" (久ひさしぶり, Hisashiburi); 81. "Hellfire" (業火, Gōka)
12	November 1, 2024	978-4-08-884264-6	—	—
82. "If Only" (もし, Moshi); 83. "I Hated You" (嫌いだった, Kiraidatta); 84. "Kindness" (優しさ, Yasashisa); 85. "I Believe You" (信じてます, Shinjitemasu); 86. "I Know" (わかってる, Wakatteru); 87. "Beyond Understanding" (理解できない, Rikaidekinai); 88. "Big Love"
13	January 4, 2025	978-4-08-884345-2	—	—
89. "Paper Scoop Juggling" (ポイジャグリング, Poi Jaguringu); 90. "A Day in the Life of Doug" (ダグのいちにち, Dagu no Ichinichi); 91. "Sparkling Shining Bombstars" (筋肉爆弾星, Supākuringu Shainingu Sutāfu Ito); 92. "Van" (ヴァン); 93. "Ex-Boyfriend" (元カレ, Moto Kare); 94. "A Day in the Life of Rita" (ダグのいちにち, Rita no Ichinichi); 95. "Dance With Me" (踊ろう, Odorou)
14	April 4, 2025	978-4-08-884426-8	—	—
96. "Welcome Back" (おかえり, Okaeri); 97. "Failure" (落ちこぼれ, Ochikobore); 98. "Anita" (アニタ); 99. "That Goes for Both" (お互たがい様, Otagaisama); 100. "Rita" (リタ); 101. "Don't You Forget It" (覚おぼえておけ, Oboete Oke); 102. "Pretend" (ごっこ, Gokko)
15	August 4, 2025	978-4-08-884627-9	—	—
103. "From the Moment I Met You" (出会った時から, Deatta Toki kara); 104. "Louis" (ルイ, Rui); 105. "Silvia" (シルビア, Shirubia); 106. "Night and Sea" (夜と海, Yoru to Umi); 107. "Snow Dust" (細氷, Sunō Dasuto); 108. "TWO TOGETHER" (2人一緒, Futari Issho); 109. "Hazy" (曖昧, Aimai)
LUKE	October 3, 2025	978-4-08-884721-4	—	—
LUKE 1–6
16	January 5, 2026	978-4-08-884803-7	—	—
110. "Killer Fishermen" (漁業殺し屋, Gyogyō Koroshiya); 111. "Tantrum" (癇癪, Kanshaku); 112. "Hometown" (故鄉, Kokyō); 113. "Play All You Can" (遊び放題, Asobi Hōdai); 114. "Love Forever"; 115. "Ferris Wheel" (観覧車, Kanransha); 116. "Revenge" (復讐, Fukushū); 117. "We Can Never Change" (変われたい, Kawaretai)
17	April 3, 2026	978-4-08-885013-9	—	—
118. "Gamble" (賭け, Kake); 119. "Honest" (正直, Shōjiki); 120. "Jealous" (羨ましかった, Urayamashikatta); 121. "I Love Her the Most in the Entire World" (世界で一番好き, Sekai de ichiban suki); 122. "Boxed hot guys" (箱イケメン, Hako ikemen); 123. "Careless" (詰め, Tsume)
18	August 4, 2026	978-4-08-885166-2	—	—
124. "Farewell" (さよならです, Sayonara desu); 125. "A Battle to One-up the Ex-boyfriend" (元カレマウントバトル大会, Moto Karemaunto Batoru Taikai); 126. "Trap" (罠, Wana); 127. "Spinach" (スピナッチ, Supinacchi); 128. "Immortal" (不死身, Fujimi); 129. "Great Reset" (グレートリセット, Gurētorisetto)
19	December 4, 2026	978-4-08-885276-8	—	—

==== Chapters not yet in tankōbon format ====
These chapters have yet to be published in a tankōbon volume. They were serialized on Shōnen Jump+.

130. "I Knew" (わかってた, Wakatteta)
131. "A Trip to the Countryside" (田舎に泊まろう, Inakanitomarō)
132. "Doting Parents" (親バカ, Oya Baka)
133. "Distracted" (気が散る, Ki ga Chiru)
134. "Forest" ((森, Mori)
135. "The Deer You Fail to Catch" (逃した鹿, Nogashita Shika)
136. "Tapio" (タピオ)
137. "Yuki" (雪)
138. "More Than Anyone Else in the World" (この世界の誰よりも, Kono Sekai no Dare Yori mo)
139. "Worker Bee" (働き蜂, Hataraki Bachi)
140. "Trust" (信頼, Shinrai)
141. "Picture Book" (絵本, Ehon)
142. "Brat" (クソガキ, Kusogaki)
143. "Escort" (エスコート, Esukōto)
144. "Bottom Rung" (最底辺, Saiteihen)
145. "How to Get Along With the Younger Brother" (弟と仲良くなる方法, Otōto to Nakayoku naru Hōhō)
146. "A Kind World" (優しり世界, Yasashiri Sekai)
147. "The Aristocratic Type" (貴族風イケメン, Kizokufū Ikemen)

=== Anime ===
An anime television series adaptation was announced by Bandai Namco Filmworks on October 2, 2025. It will be produced by Sunrise and Felix Film and directed by Shinsuke Gomi, with characters designed by Junko Yamanaka. The series is set to premiere in Spring 2027.

== Reception ==
The series ranked third in the 2023 Next Manga Award in the web manga category. The series ranked ninth on AnimeJapan's "Most Wanted Anime Adaptation" poll in 2024. The series ranked fifth in the 2025 edition of the poll.
