= Felix Film =

Japanese animation studio

Felix Film Corporation

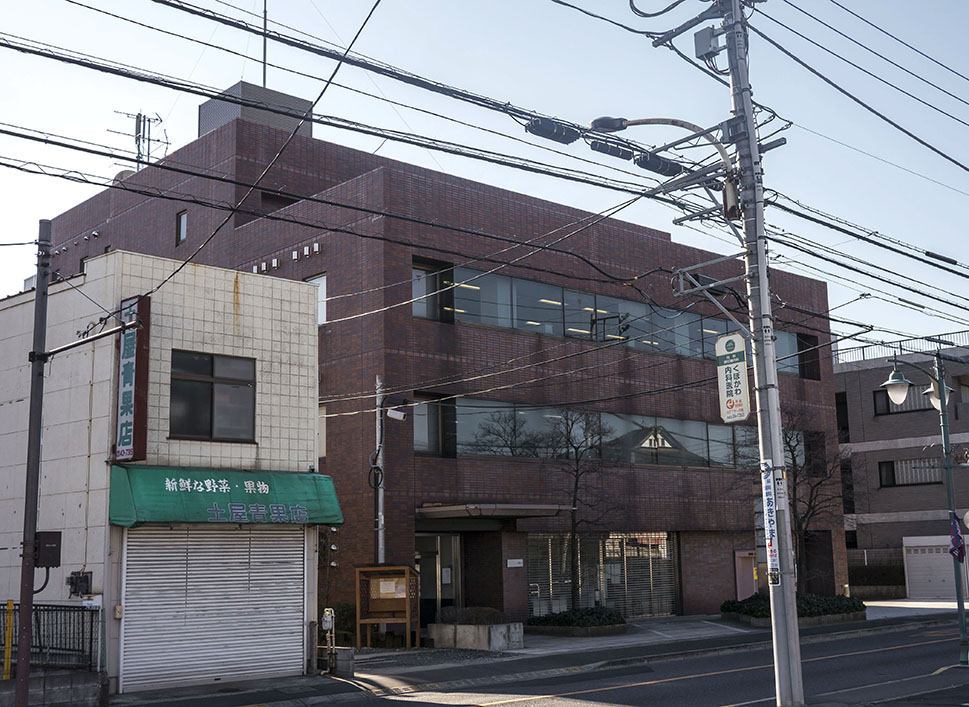
- Headquarters in Mitaka, Tokyo
- Native name: 株式会社FelixFilm
- Romanized name: Kabushiki-gaisha Ferikkusu Firumu
- Industry: Japanese animation
- Founded: May 14, 2014; 12 years ago
- Headquarters: 6-13-33 Shimorenjaku, Mitaka, Tokyo, Japan
- Key people: Tomohito Naka (CEO); Garyuu Tanaka (board member)
- Total equity: US$5,000,000
- Number of employees: 97
- Divisions: Kobe Studio
- Website: felixfilm.co.jp

Felix Film Corporation (Japanese: 株式会社FelixFilm, Hepburn: Kabushiki-gaisha Ferikkusu Firumu) is a Japanese 3DCG-focused animation studio founded on May 14, 2014, in Mitaka, Tokyo.

== Works ==
=== Television series ===
Title	Director(s)	First run start date	First run end date	Ep.	Note(s)	Ref.
A Good Librarian Like a Good Shepherd	Yū Nobuta	October 8, 2014	December 24, 2014	12	Based on a visual novel developed by August and published by Hazuki. Co-production with Hoods Entertainment.	
Nekopara	Yasutaka Yamamoto	January 9, 2020	March 26, 2020	12	Based on a visual novel developed by Neko Works and published by Sekai Project.	
Otherside Picnic	Takuya Satō	January 4, 2021	March 22, 2021	12	Based on a novel series written by Iori Miyazawa. Co-production with Liden Films.	
Aharen-san Is Indecipherable	Yasutaka Yamamoto; Tomoe Makino	April 2, 2022	June 18, 2022	12	Based on a manga series written by Asato Mizu.	
Saving 80,000 Gold in Another World for My Retirement	Hiroshi Tamada	January 8, 2023	March 26, 2023	12	Based on a light novel series written by FUNA.	
MF Ghost	Tomohito Naka	October 2, 2023	December 18, 2023	12	Based on a manga series written by Shuichi Shigeno.	
You Are Ms. Servant	Ayumu Watanabe	October 6, 2024	December 22, 2024	12	Based on a manga series written by Shotan.	
MF Ghost 2nd Season	Tomohito Naka	October 7, 2024	December 23, 2024	12	Sequel to MF Ghost.	
The Most Notorious "Talker" Runs the World's Greatest Clan	Yuta Takamura	October 7, 2024	December 23, 2024	12	Based on a light novel series written by Jaki. Co-production with Ga-Crew.	
Aharen-san Is Indecipherable 2nd Season	Yasutaka Yamamoto; Tomoe Makino	April 7, 2025	June 23, 2025	12	Sequel to Aharen-san wa Hakarenai.	
Scooped Up by an S-Rank Adventurer!	Hiroshi Tamada	July 11, 2025	September 26, 2025	12	Based on a light novel series written by Sora Suigetsu.	
MF Ghost 3rd Season	Tomohito Naka	January 4, 2026	March 29, 2026	13	Sequel to MF Ghost 2nd Season.	
Reincarnated as a Dragon Hatchling	Yuta Takamura	January 10, 2026	March 28, 2026	12	Based on a light novel series written by Nekoko. Co-production with Ga-Crew.	
I Want to End This Love Game	Azuma Tani	April 14, 2026	June 30, 2026	12	Based on a manga series written by Yuki Domoto.	
A Tale of the Secret Saint	Tomoe Makino	October 3, 2026	TBA	TBA	Based on a light novel series written by Touya.	
Kindergarten Wars	Shinsuke Gomi	Q2 2027	TBA	TBA	Based on a manga series written by You Chiba. Co-production with Sunrise.	
Soara and the House of Monsters	Takaharu Ozaki	2027	TBA	TBA	Based on a manga series written by Hidenori Yamaji.	
Gokigenyō, Ikkyoku Ika ga?	Kaori	TBA	TBA	TBA	Based on a manga series written by Tsukasa Unohana.	

=== Original video animations ===
Title	Release date	Ep.	Runtime	Note(s)	Ref.
A Good Librarian Like a Good Shepherd	December 25, 2014 – May 28, 2015	6	9 minutes	Based on a visual novel developed by August and published by Hazuki. Co-production with Hoods Entertainment.	
Nekopara	December 22, 2017	1	58 minutes	Based on the original Nekopara visual novel.	
Nekopara Extra	July 27, 2018	1	22 minutes	Based on the Nekopara Extra visual novel.	
Hairpin Double	February 4, 2022	1	7 minutes	Based on the 30th anniversary of the Okayama International Circuit. Co-production with Ga-Crew.	
