= The Most Notorious "Talker" Runs the World's Greatest Clan =

Japanese light novel series

- First light novel volume cover

最凶の支援職【話術士】である俺は世界最強クランを従える (Saikyō no Shienshoku "Wajutsushi" dearu Ore wa Sekai Saikyō Kuran o Shitagaeru)
- Genre: Fantasy
- Novel series
- Written by: Jaki
- Published by: Shōsetsuka ni Narō
- Original run: September 7, 2019 – July 25, 2020
- Light novel
- Written by: Jaki
- Illustrated by: fame
- Published by: Overlap
- English publisher: NA: Seven Seas Entertainment
- Imprint: Overlap Bunko
- Original run: June 25, 2020 – present
- Volumes: 5
- Manga
- Written by: Jaki
- Illustrated by: Yamorichan
- Published by: Overlap
- English publisher: NA: Seven Seas Entertainment
- Imprint: Gardo Comics
- Magazine: Comic Gardo
- Original run: June 12, 2020 – present
- Volumes: 12
- Anime television series
- Directed by: Yuta Takamura
- Written by: Takayo Ikami
- Studio: Felix Film; Ga-Crew
- Licensed by: Crunchyroll (streaming); SEA: Muse Communication
- Original network: Tokyo MX, BS NTV, AT-X
- Original run: October 7, 2024 – December 23, 2024
- Episodes: 12

The Most Notorious "Talker" Runs the World's Greatest Clan (最凶の支援職【話術士】である俺は世界最強クランを従える, Saikyō no Shienshoku "Wajutsushi" dearu Ore wa Sekai Saikyō Kuran o Shitagaeru), also known informally among fans as SaiShiSou (サイシーソー) or by the abbreviated title Saikyō no Shienshoku (最強の支援職), is a Japanese light novel series written by Jaki and illustrated by Fame. It was initially serialized on the user-generated novel publishing website Shōsetsuka ni Narō from September 2019 to July 2020. It was later acquired by Overlap who began publishing it under their Overlap Bunko imprint in June 2020. A manga adaptation illustrated by Yamorichan began serialization on Overlap's Comic Gardo manga service in June 2020. An anime television series adaptation produced by Felix Film and Ga-Crew aired from October to December 2024.

== Characters ==
Noel Stollen (ノエル・シュトーレン, Noeru Shutōren)
Voiced by: Daiki Yamashita, Yū Wakui (young)
Alma Judikhali (アルマ・イウディカーレ, Aruma Iudikāre)
Voiced by: Yu Serizawa
Koga Tsukishima (コウガ・ツキシマ, Kōga Tsukishima)
Voiced by: Yōsuke Ōmomo
Finocchio Barzini (フィノッキオ・バルジーニ, Finokkio Barujīni)
Voiced by: Takehito Koyasu
Brandon Stollen (ブランドン・シュトーレン, Burandon Shutōren)
Voiced by: Shunsuke Sakuya
Lloyd (ロイド, Roido)
Voiced by: Yoshiki Nakajima
Tanya Clark (タニア・クラーク, Tania Kurāku)
Voiced by: Kaede Hondo
Walter (ヴァルター, Varutā)
Voiced by: Akihiro Tajima
Wolf Lehman (ウォルフ・レーマン, Worufu Rēman)
Voiced by: Seiji Maeda
Lycia Mercedes (リーシャ・メルセデス, Rīsha Merusedesu)
Voiced by: Kaori Maeda
Leon Frederic (レオン・フレデリク, Reon Furederiku)
Voiced by: Shogo Sakata
Loki (ロキ, Roki)
Voiced by: Tasuku Hatanaka
Albert Gambino (アルバート・ガンビーノ, Arubāto Ganbīno)
Voiced by: Tatsumaru Tachibana
Hugo Coppelius (ヒューゴ・コッペリウス, Hyūgo Kopperiusu)
Voiced by: Hiroki Takahashi

== Media ==
=== Light novel ===
Written by Jaki, The Most Notorious "Talker" Runs the World's Greatest Clan was initially serialized on the user-generated novel publishing website Shōsetsuka ni Narō from September 7, 2019, to July 25, 2020. It was later acquired by Overlap who began publishing it with illustrations by fame under their Overlap Bunko light novel imprint on June 25, 2020. Five volumes have been released as of March 2026. The series is licensed in North America by Seven Seas Entertainment.

No.	Original release date	Original ISBN	North American release date	North American ISBN
1	June 25, 2020	978-4-86554-676-7	September 16, 2021 (digital); October 26, 2021 (print)	978-1-64827-610-1
1. Prologue; 2. Chapter 1: "The Ruthless Talker"; 3. Chapter 2: "Reawakening"; 4. Chapter 3: "A World of Humanity and Justice"; 5. Chapter 4: "The King's Vessel"; 6. Epilogue; 7. Side story: "The Strongest and Most Notorious Seeker"
2	October 25, 2020	978-4-86554-759-7	December 9, 2021 (digital); January 11, 2022 (print)	978-1-64827-639-2
1. Prologue; 2. Chapter 1: "Beyond Good and Evil"; 3. Chapter 2: "That Snake Has Wings"; 4. Chapter 3: "An Honest Scheme"; 5. Chapter 4: "More Savage than Heaven"; 6. Epilogue
3	February 25, 2021	978-4-86554-802-0	September 8, 2022 (digital); November 8, 2022 (print)	978-1-63858-266-3
1. Prologue; 2. Chapter 1: "The Demon Lord"; 3. Chapter 2: "Glory of the Corrupt"; 4. Chapter 3: "The Path of Those Who Would Conquer"; 5. Chapter 4: "Dance of the Winter Flowers"; 6. Epilogue
4	December 25, 2021	978-4-8240-0063-7	April 20, 2023 (digital); May 16, 2023 (print)	978-1-63858-705-7
1. Prologue; 2. Chapter 1: "The Blinding Light of the Untamable Snake"; 3. Chapter 2: "The Creed of Fools"; 4. Chapter 3: "The Seven Star Cup"; 5. Chapter 4: "Noel Stollen"; 6. Epilogue
5	March 25, 2026	978-4-8240-1562-4	April 13, 2027 (digital)	979-8-90209-526-2

=== Manga ===
A manga adaptation illustrated by Yamorichan began serialization on Overlap's Comic Gardo manga service on June 12, 2020. The manga's chapters have been collected into twelve tankōbon volumes as of May 2026. The manga adaptation is also licensed in North America by Seven Seas Entertainment.

No.	Original release date	Original ISBN	North American release date	North American ISBN
1	October 25, 2020	978-4-86554-771-9	April 26, 2022	978-1-64827-793-1
1. "A Legendary Grandfather, and Why the Weakest Aims for Greatness"; 2. "How a Talker Fights"; 3. "Money Matters"; 4. "A Party Divided"; 5. "Payback by Any Means Necessary"; 6. "The Punishment for Betrayal"; Bonus: "Green Before Blue Beyond"
2	February 25, 2021	978-4-86554-857-0	July 12, 2022	978-1-63858-344-8
7. "The Weakest Seeker Becomes the Most Notorious"; 8. "The Taste of Whisky"; 9. "A Rising Star?"; 10. "Legendary Descendants"; 11. "Prodigy"; 12. "A Body to Get Your Hands On?"; Bonus: "The Meaning of Pride"
3	July 25, 2021	978-4-86554-966-9	November 8, 2022	978-1-63858-815-3
13. "One-Sided Slaughter"; 14. "How to Dig Your Own Grave"; 15. "You Think an Apology's Gonna Cut It?"; 16. "The Truth of the Legend"; 17. "The Faceless"; 18. "The Swordsman of the Far East"; Extra; Bonus: "The Beast in the Crypt"
4	December 25, 2021	978-4-8240-0073-6	May 16, 2023	978-1-68579-498-9
19. "You Disappoint Me"; 20. "The Price of Honor"; 21. "This Isn't a Game"; 22. "Pay It Back a Thousand Times"; 23. "The Bold Smile of the Conspirator"; 24. "Wrapped Around My Little Finger"; Bonus: "Strategic Restraint"
5	May 25, 2022	978-4-8240-0198-6	September 19, 2023	978-1-68579-924-3
25. "A Most Appropriate Replacement"; 26. "Roaring Thunder"; 27. "He Who Wears the Crown"; 28. "To the Abyss, I Have Returned!"; 29. "Ranking Up"; Extra; Bonus: "The Joy of the Dark"
6	September 25, 2022	978-4-8240-0297-6	January 16, 2024	979-8-88843-114-6
30. "Taking the Bull by the Horns"; 31. "Rearguard Rules and Scheming Snakes"; 32. "The Winged Knights"; 33. "A Bold and Meticulously Planned Trip"; Bonus: "The Brilliance of the Extreme"
7	March 25, 2023	978-4-8240-0452-9	August 6, 2024	979-8-88843-744-5
34. "The Test Begins!"; 35. "The Dantalion"; 36. "Torment"; 37. "Shot Dead"; Bonus: "A Malignant Tumor"
8	September 25, 2023	978-4-8240-0618-9	January 14, 2025	979-8-89160-200-7
38. "Fallen Wings"; 39. "Nothing for Free"; 40. "The Winged Snake"; 41. "Wild Tempest"; Bonus: "What Could Have Been"
9	April 25, 2024	978-4-8240-0812-1	July 15, 2025	979-8-89373-179-8
42. "Garmr I"; 43. "Garmr II"; 44. "Amassing Capital"; 45. "An Offer You Can't Refuse"; 46. "Leaving You All Behind"
10	November 25, 2024	978-4-8240-1004-9	December 16, 2025	979-8-89561-339-9
47. "Acceptance"; 48. "Catch-22"; 49. "A Lone Shadow"; 50. "The Duel"; 51. "Impulse Drives the Powerless"
11	August 25, 2025	978-4-8240-1319-4	June 23, 2026	979-8-89765-371-3
52. "Rivals"; 53. "Top Dog"; 54. "Truth and Deception"; 55. "Talker Tactics"; 56. "All the Way to the Top"; 57. "The Ordinary and the Extraordinary"
12	May 20, 2026	978-4-8240-1656-0	April 6, 2027	979-8-89863-252-6

=== Anime ===
An anime television series adaptation was announced during the third livestream for the "10th Anniversary Memorial Overlap Bunko All-Star Assemble Special" event in April 2024. It is produced by Felix Film and Ga-Crew, and directed by Yuta Takamura, with scripts written by Takayo Ikami, and characters designed by Kenji Terao. The series aired from October 7 to December 23, 2024, on Tokyo MX and BS NTV. All theme songs are performed by Kohta Yamamoto, with the opening theme song "Tactics" feat. Saiki of Band-Maid, and the ending theme song "Liberation" feat. Aaamyy. Crunchyroll licensed the series for streaming. Muse Communication licensed the series in Southeast Asia.

==== Episodes ====
No.	Title	Directed by	Storyboarded by	Chief animation directed by	Original release date (Note: Episodes are released on ABEMA Premium, dAnime Store, Crunchyroll and simulcast platforms by Muse 6 days before their televised airings.)
1	"Why the Weakest Aims to be the Strongest"; Transliteration: "Saijaku ga Saikyō o Mezasu Riyū" (Japanese: 最弱が最強を目指す理由)	Yūta Takamura	Yūta Takamura	Kenji Terao	October 7, 2024
In a world of magic high concentrations of mana can form an Abyss, a portal through which demons enter from the Void. Noel Stollen is present when an Abyss opens in his hometown, allowing a Lord demon to enter. His grandfather Brandon the Overdeath, a retired Seeker who destroys demons and closes Abyss portals, banishes the Lord but is fatally wounded. Before he dies, Noel promises to become a Seeker more famous than Brandon. Years later Noel has formed a party known as Blue Beyond, comprising the warrior Walter, Tanya the mage and Lloyd the swordsman. Unfortunately, Noel's innate skill is Talker, a support class that boosts his ally's abilities through spoken words, but possesses no combat abilities except for a magic pistol. As a lone party it is difficult for them to find work, so Noel suggests using the party's funds plus his own savings to pay the 20million necessary to become a Clan. This would enable them to take on jobs from the Velnant Empire, assisting Noel in his goal of becoming famous. The others eventually agree, despite the risk of financial ruin. The following morning in the capital city of Etrai Noel and Walter find Lloyd and Tanya have abandoned them.
2	"This Talker Is Ruthless"; Transliteration: "Sono Wajutsushi wa Yōsha o Shinai" (Japanese: その話術士は容赦をしない)	Hiroshi Tamada	Hiroshi Tamada	Yūki Fukuchi	October 14, 2024
In his letter Lloyd admits to being in debt from a failed investment, so he and Tanya have run away with the party funds. Walter angrily plans to chase after them but Noel points out it might become a fight to the death. Instead, he and Walter visit a tavern and let if be known they will pay a bounty for the capture of Lloyd and Tanya. As Noel had hoped they are approached by elderly Seekers that spotted Lloyd and Tanya on their way to Carnot Village. Travelling together they and the Seekers catch up to Lloyd and Tanya. Walter, who is notorious for his violently short temper, is horrified as Noel unleashes his sadistic inner personality upon them. Using his voice, Noel paralyses Lloyd and Tanya and compels them to confess the truth; together they actually racked up huge gambling debts and stole the party funds to pay Lloyd's loan shark. With their confession Noel illegally sells Lloyd and Tanya for 15million to Finnochio Barzini, a slave trader and member of the Lucianos crime syndicate. Noel decides to grow stronger by cultivating a reputation as a ruthless villain. Walter decides not to follow him and quits his job as a Seeker. Noel decides to build a stronger Blue Beyond more suited to his needs.
3	"The Real Deal"; Transliteration: "Honmono no Tensai" (Japanese: 本物の天才)	Yuki Morita, Wangqing Bai & Yūta Takamura	Yūta Takamura	Kenji Terao	October 21, 2024
A young woman named Alma asks to join Blue Beyond to learn more about Overdeath's grandson, since Overdeath once defeated her grandfather Alcor Judikhali, leader of the Society of Assassins. Noel hires her immediately. Alma admits the Society of Assassins wouldn't let her join since she was taught the traditional methods by Alcor, now considered too extreme by the Society which is hoping to be sponsored by the royal family and become a legitimate spy organisation. Noel takes Alma to the forest to see if she can use the abilities he grants her effectively. He has her hunt a monster; animals mutated by proximity to an Abyss. Alma proves to have an instinctive talent for handling Noel's abilities, enough so he decides they are ready to handle a job hunting bandits at Mintz Village. On the long journey Noel explains Seekers don't just close Abyss portals, they hunt monsters, capture criminals, locate treasure and investigate mystical events. Staying the night in Eudora Village they are forced to share a room. Alma notices his muscular physique from excessive training, but is disappointed since no matter the training he will never be as good as Overdeath who was born a Warrior. Despite himself, Noel is hurt by her comments and starts to miss his grandfather.
4	"An Apology Won't Cut It"; Transliteration: "Ayamareba Yurushite Moraeru to Omou na yo" (Japanese: 謝れば許してもらえると思うなよ)	Sho Hamada	Mei Aratani	Yūki Fukuchi	October 28, 2024
The Mayor of Mintz sends them after thieves led by murderer Gordo the Razor, whom they kill. The Mayor's daughter decides she wants to be a Seeker. The Mayor insists on a victory toast. Noel reveals the Mayor has poisoned their wine to avoid paying the reward. With his voice Noel forces the Mayor to confess, then takes all their money. The Mayor begs for mercy as he has debts to the Gambino mafia. Uncaring, Noel leaves them penniless and sure to be murdered by the Gambino's. The daughter declares she hates Seekers. Returning home Alma spots an airship belonging to one of seven clans recognised as the best by the Empire. Noel decides one day Blue Beyond will be one of those clans. Flashbacks show Alma is actually Alcor's daughter, one of many he forced to murder each other until only Alma was left. She then assassinated Alcor herself. This caused the Assassins new leader, Simon Gregory, to reject her as her bloodlust was unsuitable for the Society's future as government spies. Instead, Simon sent her to Noel, whom he was sure would cause enough trouble to satisfy her bloodlust. Now, happy to have slaughtered so many thieves, Alma is determined to stay by Noel's side forever.
5	"The Swordsman from the Far East"; Transliteration: "Kyokutō no Kenshi" (Japanese: 極東の剣士)	Yasuo Ejima	Yasuo Ejima	Kenji Terao	November 4, 2024
A shape-shifter called Loki the Faceless infiltrates the prison holding murderer Hugo Coppelia. Alma lusts after Noel and tries to seduce him at every opportunity. They visit the Appraisal Association where Gnomes rank up people's skills once they have accumulated experience. Alma is ready to rank up from Scout to Assassin but Noel asks her to wait until they have hired another member, which upsets her. Loki passes Noel information on Hugo, whom Noel intends to prove is innocent so Hugo can join Blue Beyond. Loki also warns Noel about a new drug being sold by Albert of the Gambino family, a branch of the Luciano Syndicate. Alma encounters another Seeker she knows, Lycia. Noel impulsively throws a coin to a beggar named Koga. A confrontation ensues and Noel realises Koga is an Eastern swordsman. They are interrupted by Miguel, Koga's owner who controls him via an illegal Oath of Subordination. Noel interrogates Miguel and learns he is a gladiator trainer fleeing his former employers, the d'Alembert family. Noel considers murdering Miguel and bringing Koga into Blue Beyond. Alma is upset at Lycia's suggestion Noel doesn't care about her and decides if Noel does hire another member she will murder them so it will be just her and Noel.
6	"The Price of Honor"; Transliteration: "Hokori no Kachi" (Japanese: 誇りの価値)	Sho Hamada	Hiromitsu Souma	Chiyoko Sakamoto	November 11, 2024
At the last second Noel lets Miguel flee with Koga, reasoning Koga is too downtrodden to be useful. Noel returns to Alma and is able to ask Lycia about Albert's drug operation. Miguel and Koga are captured by Albert who plans to have them skinned then returned to the d'Alembert's. The Mayor of Mintz appears and tells Albert his money was stolen by Noel. Albert decides the Mayor will have his right arm cut off by Koga. Koga is forced to obey and severs the arm cleanly, impressing Albert who takes Koga for himself. Koga remembers he was born as a result of his mother being raped by bandits. When Koga was born she killed herself when her husband couldn't accept Koga was his son and not the bandits. Eventually, he sold Koga to Miguel to be rid of him. Loki is forced to betray Noel by luring him into a trap so Koga can kill him. Noel almost shoots Loki but forgives him. Koga regrets having to fight Noel as he is still grateful Noel gave him the coin. Noel is astonished Koga is able to move his sword fast enough to disrupt air currents, deflecting Noel's voice. The attack sends Noel falling from the roof.
7	"World Without Honor or Humanity"; Transliteration: "Jingi Naki Sekai" (Japanese: 仁義なき世界)	Hiroshi Tamada	Yūta Takamura, Yuri Isowa & Wen Baoning	Kenji Terao	November 18, 2024
Koga hesitates to kill Noel; enraging Noel that Koga would risk being killed by Albert for failing him. Alma duels Koga but they are evenly matched. Noel summons the city guard, forcing Koga to evade capture. Albert murders Miguel for Koga's failure then confronts Noel at the Seeker Guild. Albert is threatened by the Guild Master that Mafia causing trouble inside a Guild is forbidden. Albert flees when Noel claims he poisoned Albert's wine. Albert's lieutenant Laios makes a deal with Noel to leave the city. Noel does so but returns a week later, having sent Loki on an important investigation. Albert confronts Noel again but Noel reveals Loki uncovered Albert's birth certificate, proving he could not possibly be the biological son of the Gambino's previous boss, merely the son of the boss' mistress. Noel also deduces Albert poisoned the previous boss to replace him. Albert's men, who already hate him for forcing them to murder the mayor of Mintz, his wife and daughter and then desecrate the bodies, abandon him. Laios decides they will only acknowledge Albert if he defeats Noel. Albert tries to refuse but Finnochio appears and demands the duel go ahead with himself as a witness for the Lucianos Syndicate.
8	"The Makings of a Champion"; Transliteration: "Ōja no Utsuwa" (Japanese: 王者の器)	Yūta Takamura	Erika Nakajima	Chiyoko Sakamoto	November 25, 2024
Albert picks Koga as his proxy. During the duel Noel confuses Koga by throwing away his pistol. Koga slashes Noel who reveals he hid extra bullets in his pockets. Having slashed an ice bullet Koga is frozen, allowing Noel to knock him unconscious. For defeating Albert Finnochio pays Noel 50million and asks him to become the next Gambino boss. Noel refuses, so Finnochio reveals his class is Punisher, which allows him to steal hearts from people's chests once they refuse him twice. Having decided Noel poses a risk to the Lucianos he steals Noel's heart and demands he lead the Gambino's or die. Noel refuses and dares Finnochio to kill him, as it would be admitting to the world that he, a mafia boss, was too scared of Noel to let him live. Impressed at being outwitted Finnochio returns his heart but warns Noel he had better become someone worth fearing in the future. Finnochio punishes Albert by severing his hands and feet and imprisoning him in a pig sty where, since pigs eat anything, he will eventually be eaten alive. Noel frees Koga who joins Blue Beyond of his own free will. Noel decides to finally register Blue Beyond as a clan. Noel realises he has gained enough experience to become a B Rank Talker.
9	"The Snake Sharpens Its Fangs"; Transliteration: "Dokuga o Togu Hebi" (Japanese: 毒牙を磨ぐ蛇)	Yūta Takamura & Sogano Iruka	Emi Soga & Hatsukaya Nigōten	Kenji Terao	December 2, 2024
When Noel was 14 Harold Jenkins, a Guild Inspector, informed him the Lord Demon that killed Overdeath had reappeared wielding Overdeath's missing axe. Harold worried the Lord planned to evolve into a Valiant Demon with the power to destroy entire countries. Now in the present Harold rejects Noel's application to form a clan. Elsewhere, an Abyss is closed by Zeke Feinstein of the Supreme Dragon clan, one of the strongest Seekers in the Empire. Harold explains to Noel that within a year an Abyss will open and a Valiant will emerge. Therefore the guild can't allow inexperienced Seekers to form clans unless they are already strong. Rather than give up Noel decides that within 6 months they will become one of the 7 Regalia, the strongest clans in the Empire. Noel levels up to B Rank Talker. Zeke invites the infamous Noel to join Supreme Dragon. Noel refuses unless Zeke proves himself worth following by defeating the only other Seeker as strong as himself, Leo Edin, second-in-command of the Regalia clan Pandemonium. Zeke, who hates being considered second best, is enraged and lashes out at innocent people. Lycia and Alma meet Lycia's friend Ophelia who insults Noel's reputation, unaware Alma is in his party. Meanwhile, Noel sets his sights on another famous swordsman to join Blue Beyond; Leon, leader of Ophelia's party.
10	"The Haves and the Have-Nots"; Transliteration: "Mossha to Motazarumono" (Japanese: 持つ者と持たざる者)	Michita Shiraishi	Koichi Ohata	Chiyoko Sakamoto	December 9, 2024
Noel visits Hugo Coppelia in prison, hoping to hire him for his skill Puppeteer, the ability to control puppets. He was once a famous Seeker but an unfortunate incident saw him sentenced to death for murder. Noel demonstrates he is blackmailing the guards and is making arrangements for Hugo's freedom. Hugo still refuses as he doesn't like Seekers. Noel, Alma and Koga visit a tavern where Leon and other B Rank parties hang out. There, Noel is able to use Ophelia's dislike to provoke an argument with Leon. Alma and Koga are confused but Noel assures them it is part of his plan. Harold and his granddaughter Marion, clan leader of Pandemonium, disagree on whether Leo or Noel should command the Seekers against the Valiant and wager leadership of the Jenkins family on the outcome. Leon reveals to his party the guild has invited them to form a clan. Unfortunately, Harold rejects their application, claiming the invitation Leon received is fake. Leon begs for a chance to prove themselves so Harold offers to approve their clan application if they defeat the recently appeared Abyss demon Dantalion of the Cursed Eyes. He also warns Leon they will be competing against Noel, and whichever party slays Dantalion will be promoted to a clan.
11	"The Price of Being Right"; Transliteration: "Tadashi-sa no Daishō" (Japanese: 正しさの代償)	Yasuo Ejima	Hiroshi Tamada & Erika Nakajima	Kenji Terao	December 16, 2024
For the contest Harold allows the two parties to sabotage each other. Harold also decrees the losing party will disband permanently. Three days later the contest starts. Leon's party are baffled Noel, Koga and Alma choose to wait patiently instead of starting. Vaclav, Keim and Ophelia all admit Noel approached them asking them to betray the others. This puts doubt in Leon's mind since Noel had not approached him. Meanwhile Noel explains to Koga and Alma that Leon's party will fall apart because he pointed out to the other three Leon is far superior to them, so they will always be trapped in his shadow. In the Abyss Ophelia is injured by Dantalion so Keim suggests a dangerous move that puts him at risk. Leon refuses and suggests abandoning the contest to team up with Noel. Vaclav, Keim and Ophelia misinterpret this as Leon betraying them like Noel warned them he would. After a huge argument Keim stabs Leon non-fatally to end the contest and tearfully admits he always hated Leon for being better than him. With their party falling apart Noel suddenly appears and thanks them for doing most of the work already. With his Strategist thinking speed Dantalion can't read Noel's mind fast enough and is almost killed. Dantalion desperately attacks Noel, only for Alma to appear behind it.
12	"The Snake Has Wings"; Transliteration: "Sono Hebi ni wa Tsubasa Haete Iru" (Japanese: その蛇には翼が生えている)	Michita Shiraishi	Koichi Ohata	Kenji Terao & Chiyoko Sakamoto	December 23, 2024
Alma kills Dantalion. Harold promotes Blue Beyond to a full clan and dissolves Leon's Winged Knights party. Ophelia leaves the city. Vaclav joins Veronica Redbone's party, the Red Lotus. Keim hopes to find a way to tell Leon not to feel guilty. Leon is attacked by Edgar, jealous leader of the War Eagles. Noel rescues Leon by cutting off Edgar's nose. Leon admits Noel was right, the Winged Knights were doomed to fail. Leon still hopes to be a great Seeker and is convinced to join Blue Beyond. To test their capability Harold sends them against Garmr the Wolf King. Keim attacks Leon claiming he is a traitor but Leon defeats him. As Leon walks away he realises Keim attacked him on purpose to free him from his guilt. Noel reveals their clan crest, a winged snake, and renames Blue Beyond as Wild Tempest. Facing Garmr all four of them are pushed to the brink of death. However, Noel reveals almost dying was part of his plan as it allowed them to lure Garmr into a conversation and poison him with Alma's assassin blood. With Garmr dead Harold realises Noel's strength of will is identical to Overdeath. Noel confirms Wild Tempest are on track to become a Regalia within 6 months and that his goal to become the strongest Seeker will be realized by leading the greatest clan the world has ever seen.

== See also ==
- Berserk of Gluttony, another light novel series with the same illustrator
