= Marry Grave =

Japanese manga series

- First tankōbon volume cover, featuring Riseman Sawyer

マリーグレイブ (Marī Gureibu)
- Genre: Adventure; Comedy; Dark fantasy
- Manga
- Written by: Hidenori Yamaji
- Published by: Shogakukan
- Imprint: Shōnen Sunday Comics
- Magazine: Weekly Shōnen Sunday
- Original run: December 13, 2017 – January 16, 2019
- Volumes: 5
- icon

Marry Grave (Japanese: マリーグレイブ, Hepburn: Marī Gureibu) is a Japanese manga series written and illustrated by Hidenori Yamaji. It was serialized in Shogakukan's shōnen manga magazine Weekly Shōnen Sunday from December 2017 to January 2019, with its chapters collected in five tankōbon volumes.

== Premise ==
In an era when humans and demons share the same continent, the two species live side by side, in constant conflict. Riseman Sawyer marries his fiancée, Rosalie. Immediately after the ceremony, however, the town is attacked by monsters, and Sawyer dies fighting to defend it. Sixty years later, Rosalie, the sole survivor, uses forbidden magic to gather the ingredients listed in the "Deadman's Recipe" and resurrects Sawyer as an undead being, but in doing so, she sacrifices her own life. After being resurrected, Sawyer embarks on a journey across the land with the goal of gathering the ingredients listed in the Deadman's Recipe, so that he can bring Rosalie back to life.

== Characters ==
Riseman Sawyer (ライズマン・ソーヤー, Raizuman Sōyā)
An undead man who travels to gather the ingredients listed in the Deadman's Recipe in order to bring his wife, Rosalie, back to life. His body is covered in stitches and bandages, and he travels carrying a coffin containing Rosalie's remains. Abused in his youth and nearly dying of hunger after surviving a werewolf attack and being saved by Dante, he still maintains his cheerful personality. He died at his wedding while fighting a one-sided battle against demons. Years later, he was revived by his wife, Rosalie, who exchanged her life for his after acquiring all the required recipes.
Rosalie (ロザリー, Rozarī)
Sawyer's wife. After their wedding, Sawyer was attacked and killed by a monster. In an attempt to bring him back to life, she spent decades gathering the ingredients listed in the Deadman's Recipe—a practice considered taboo—and eventually succeeded. However, she sacrificed her own life as the final ingredient in the process.
Dante (ダンテ)
A strong swordsman and traveler. He was Sawyer's guardian during his youth. Hailing from a clan of snake-like humanoid demons, he embarks on a quest for revenge against Markov, the leader of the clan and his stepfather, for murdering his parents. During his battle with Markov, Dante is petrified for hundreds of years. Sawyer and his allies later confront Markov, freeing Dante during the battle. Dante then joins forces with Sawyer to finally defeat Markov.
Jane (ジーン, Jīn)
A long-lived fairy with unique strength and longevity. After losing all her loved ones to old age, she became cold and isolated until she met Rosalie. Years later, she joins Rosalie's husband, Sawyer, on his quest.
Zel (セル, Seru)
A swordsman who hunts Sawyer and knows his weaknesses. He has a sword named Valmunk (ヴァルムンク, Varumunku) who is foul-mouthed and vulgar and always curses at Zel.
Markov (マルコフ, Marukofu)
The Gorgon King who has the ability to turn people into stone statues. He was Dante's stepfather and used him as a puppet to slaughter soldiers. He lied to Dante about what had happened to his parents, telling him that they threw him away. He was actually responsible for their deaths. Years later, Dante confronts him to take revenge, but Markov petrifies him, leaving him that way for over a hundred years. Markov faces off against Sawyer and his allies. In the process, Dante is freed from petrification and joins forces with Sawyer to defeat Markov.

== Publication ==
Written and illustrated by Hidenori Yamaji, Marry Grave was serialized in Shogakukan's shōnen manga magazine Weekly Shōnen Sunday from December 13, 2017, to January 16, 2019. Shogakukan collected is chapters in five tankōbon volumes, released from April 18, 2018, to March 18, 2019.

=== Volumes ===
No.	Japanese release date	Japanese ISBN
1	April 18, 2018	978-4-09-128245-3
2	July 18, 2018	978-4-09-128337-5
3	October 18, 2018	978-4-09-128558-4
4	January 18, 2019	978-4-09-128774-8
5	March 18, 2019	978-4-09-127684-1

== Reception ==
Reviewing the first volume, Erkael of Manga News compared Riseman Sawyer's appearance to the protagonists of Trigun, Gungrave, and Captain Harlock (known as Albator in France). However, Erkael observed that portraying Sawyer as a "buffoon overwhelmed by events" rather than as "cool and brooding" diminishes his charisma, forces readers to wait until later in the narrative to become familiar with him, and makes him endearing only after further development. On the other hand, Erkael commented that the series's shift from a comedic and lighthearted tone to a more serious and dramatic one created a "rather surprising and welcome contrast", and praised the series for its artwork and worldbuilding. In a general review, Erkael called the series "a little gem that will surprise and move even the most discerning readers", lamenting its rushed conclusion, but expressing enjoyment after reading its five volumes.

In his review of the first volume, Guillaume Boutet of ActuaBD described the series as a mix of Trigun and Berserk in a lighter shōnen style. He praised it for its "classic and elegant" artwork and complex premise. Bouter also lamented its lack of success and Yamaji's inability to fully realize his artistic vision. By the third volume, Boutet noticed that the story's pace was accelerating, foreshadowing the cancellation of the series. Reviewing the first volume, Niwo of Manga Sanctuary praised its well-balanced travelogue structure, diverse settings and characters, and blend of humor. However, the reviewer criticized excessive humor that disrupted the narrative flow, a linear plot lacking surprise, and clichéd use of death-related comedy.

== See also ==
- Soara and the House of Monsters, another manga series by Hidenori Yamaji
