= Scooped Up by an S-Rank Adventurer! =

Japanese light novel series

- First light novel volume cover

勇者パーティーを追放された白魔導師、Sランク冒険者に拾われる ～この白魔導師が規格外すぎる～ (Yūsha Pātī o Tsuihō Sareta Shiro Madōshi, Esuranku Bōkensha ni Hirowareru: Kono Shiro Madōshi ga Kikakugai Sugiru)
- Genre: Fantasy
- Novel series
- Written by: Sora Suigetsu
- Published by: Shōsetsuka ni Narō
- Original run: March 12, 2020 – present
- Light novel
- Written by: Sora Suigetsu
- Illustrated by: DeeCHA
- Published by: Futabasha
- English publisher: NA: J-Novel Club
- Imprint: M Novels
- Original run: November 30, 2020 – present
- Volumes: 9
- Manga

Scooped Up by an S-Rank Adventurer! This White Mage is One Heck of a Healer
- Written by: Sora Suigetsu
- Illustrated by: Wasabi Mukuno
- Published by: Futabasha
- English publisher: NA: J-Novel Club
- Imprint: Monster Comics
- Magazine: Gaugau Monster
- Original run: January 22, 2021 – present
- Volumes: 11
- Anime television series
- Directed by: Hiroshi Tamada
- Written by: Akihiko Inari
- Music by: Hiroaki Tsutsumi; Tsubasa Handa
- Studio: Felix Film
- Licensed by: Crunchyroll; SEA: Medialink
- Original network: Tokyo MX, SUN, BS Fuji
- Original run: July 11, 2025 – September 26, 2025
- Episodes: 12
- icon

Scooped Up by an S-Rank Adventurer! (勇者パーティーを追放された白魔導師、Sランク冒険者に拾われる ～この白魔導師が規格外すぎる～, Yūsha Pātī o Tsuihō Sareta Shiro Madōshi, Esuranku Bōkensha ni Hirowareru: Kono Shiro Madōshi ga Kikakugai Sugiru; "The White Mage Who was Banished From the Hero's Party is Picked Up by an S-Rank Adventurer: This White Mage is Too Out of the Ordinary!") is a Japanese light novel series written by Sora Suigetsu and illustrated by DeeCHA. It began serialization online in March 2020 on the user-generated novel publishing website Shōsetsuka ni Narō. It was later acquired by Futabasha, who have published nine volumes since November 2020 under their M Novels imprint. A manga adaptation with art by Wasabi Mukuno has been serialized online via Futabasha's Gaugau Monster website since January 2021 and has been collected in twelve tankōbon volumes. An anime television series adaptation produced by Felix Film aired from July to September 2025.

== Premise ==
Lloyd, a white mage who has become an adventurer and a member of the hero's party, is one day deemed useless and unceremoniously fired; however, since he is a support magic user who believes he is merely average, he is unaware of how he will eventually become peerless. Now, in search of a job, Lloyd is snapped up for a quest by an S-rank party which has recently lost their own mage. At that time, no one knows that, as a result of losing Lloyd's support magic, the hero's party would soon collapse and that Lloyd and his new party would gain success and fame. Yet.

== Characters ==
=== Main characters ===
Lloyd (ロイド, Roido)
Voiced by: Gakuto Kajiwara (Japanese); Aiden Call, Madeleine Morris (young) (English)
Lloyd is the main character of the series, he is an extraordinary white mage that can buff his allies and give them the strength of an S-Rank adventurer or higher. However, Lloyd views himself as inadequate due to his lack of confidence, leaving most of his friends and allies dumbfounded. It is revealed later on that his master was the legendary mage Merlin.
Yui (ユイ)
Voiced by: Rina Hidaka (Japanese); Lisette Monique Diaz (English)
Yui is the leader of her S-Rank party, she is shown to be an extremely capable and talented swordswoman. In the past, Yui's hometown was destroyed by a demon and she's held a grudge against them ever since. She is usually baffled by Lloyd's lack of confidence.
Silica (シリカ, Shirika)
Voiced by: Haruka Shiraishi (Japanese); Jennifer AuBuchon (English)
Silica is the mage of her S-Rank party, she is extremely talented as mentioned by Lloyd. Like the others, she is usually baffled by Lloyd's lack of confidence.
Cross (クロス, Kurosu)
Voiced by: Daisuke Hirose (Japanese); Jessie James Grelle (English)
Cross is the archer of his S-Rank party, he is extremely talented as pointed out by Lloyd. Like the others in his party, he is baffled by Lloyd's lack of confidence.
Daggas (ダッガス, Daggasu)
Voiced by: Yūichirō Umehara (Japanese); Reagan Murdock (English)
Daggas is the tank of his S-Rank party, he is extremely capable and often protects his other party members. Like the others in his party, he is baffled by Lloyd's lack of confidence.

=== Hero's Party ===
Allen (アレン, Aren)
Voiced by: Ryōhei Kimura (Japanese); Kyle Igneczi (English)
Allen is the leader of one of the top four hero parties in the entire world, however he is weak and incompetent. He thought that he had gotten stronger not realizing that Lloyd was the reason he had been so successful. After banishing Lloyd, Allen and his party started repeatedly failing one quest after another. After refusing to defend the country, Lloyd was named the hero and Allen was ignored and stripped of his title as hero, as a result he decided to prove himself by retrieving his holy sword, only to leave behind a path of destruction while he did.
Lina (リナ, Rina)
Voiced by: Yui Ishikawa (Japanese); Celeste Perez (English)
Lina was the Tank of the hero's party, initially she like the others were arrogant and insulted Lloyd for being useless and agreed to kick him out of their party. But after seeing how weak they were without Lloyd, she came to realize how wrong she was about him. Even more so after permanently losing one of her arms during one of their disastrous quests that ended in failure. Lina left the hero's party to search for Lloyd and reconciled with him. Lina decided to not return to the hero's party and became an adventurer, eventually managing to reach B-Rank.
Miiya (ミイヤ, Mīya)
Voiced by: Mizuki Mano (Japanese); Izzi Raine (English)
Miiya was the mage of the hero's party, she was initially arrogant like the others and happily agreed to kick Lloyd of their party. But after failing several of their quests she started to understand just how weak she really was. Miiya was deeply in love with Allen, but after seeing how weak and careless he was, she was heartbroken and left the hero's party in tears.
Lulu (ルル, Ruru)
Voiced by: Ayaka Nanase (Japanese); Kelsey Cruz (English)
Lulu was the archer of hero's party and like the others was extremely arrogant and happily agreed to kick Lloyd out of their party. However, they started to fail one quest after another, despite this she, Sheena, and Allen thought that they just had an off day. But after Lloyd successfully helped defend their city and was called a hero, she along with Sheena and Allen decided to leave to prove that Allen was the true hero. However, their actions were doing more harm than good, but Allen convinced them that this was necessary to prove himself and assumed that everything would be fine. However, it is hinted that Lulu was starting to doubt Allen and his intentions.
Sheena (シーナ, Shīna)
Voiced by: Saeko Ooki (Japanese); Hannah Magers (English)
Sheena was the saint and healer of the hero's party, she like the others was arrogant and happily agreed to kick Lloyd out of their party. But after they started failing one quest after another, things started looking grim for them, Sheena was baffled by how weak her magic was compared to when Lloyd was still in their party. Sheena still naively had confidence in Allen, despite Lloyd being called the hero instead. Sheena and Lulu continued to accompany Allen to show the world that he was the true hero. Unfortunately, his actions were doing more harm than good, Allen convinced her that this was necessary to prove himself and assumed that everything would be fine. However, it was hinted that Sheena was slowly losing trust in Allen and is unsure about his intentions.

=== Others ===
Will (ウィル, Uiru)
Voiced by: Toshiki Masuda (Japanese); Nic Hamill (English)
Ryouen (リョウエン)
Voiced by: Nichika Ōmori (Japanese); Kelly Greenshield (English)
Merlin (マーリン, Mārin)
Voiced by: Marina Inoue (Japanese); Katie Wetch (English)
Claire (クレア, Kurea)
Voiced by: M.A.O (Japanese); Abigail Blythe (English)

== Media ==
=== Light novel ===
Written by Sora Suigetsu, Scooped Up by an S-Rank Adventurer! began serialization on the user-generated novel publishing website Shōsetsuka ni Narō on March 12, 2020. It was later acquired by Futabasha who began publishing the series with illustrations by DeeCHA under their M Novels light novel imprint on November 30, 2020. Nine volumes (including four volumes published digital-only) have been released as of July 2026.

During their panel at New York Comic Con 2025, J-Novel Club announced that they had also licensed the light novel series for English publication.

No.	Original release date	Original ISBN	English release date	English ISBN
1	November 30, 2020	978-4-575-24350-5	January 14, 2026	978-1-7183-2542-5
2	May 28, 2021	978-4-575-24408-3	March 23, 2026	978-1-7183-2544-9
3	November 29, 2021	978-4-575-24468-7	June 8, 2026	978-1-7183-2546-3
4	July 29, 2022	978-4-575-24548-6	August 24, 2026	978-1-7183-2548-7
5	March 30, 2023	978-4-575-24616-2	November 9, 2026	978-1-7183-2550-0
6	February 29, 2024 (ebook)	—	January 25, 2027	978-1-7183-2552-4
7	November 29, 2024 (ebook)	—	—	—
8	June 30, 2025 (ebook)	—	—	—
9	July 30, 2026 (ebook)	—	—	—

=== Manga ===
A manga adaptation illustrated by Wasabi Mukuno began serialization on Futabasha's Gaugau Monster website on January 22, 2021. The manga's chapters have been collected into eleven tankōbon volumes as of June 2026.

During their panel at Anime Expo 2025, J-Novel Club announced that they had licensed the manga adaptation for English publication.

No.	Original release date	Original ISBN	English release date	English ISBN
1	May 28, 2021	978-4-575-41240-6	September 10, 2025	978-1-7183-9469-8
2	November 30, 2021	978-4-575-41327-4	November 26, 2025	978-1-7183-9470-4
3	May 30, 2022	978-4-575-41427-1	February 18, 2026	978-1-7183-9471-1
4	November 30, 2022	978-4-575-41537-7	May 13, 2026	978-1-7183-9472-8
5	May 30, 2023	978-4-575-41656-5	August 12, 2026	978-1-7183-9473-5
6	November 30, 2023	978-4-575-41777-7	October 28, 2026	978-1-7183-9474-2
7	May 30, 2024	978-4-575-41896-5	—	—
8	November 29, 2024	978-4-575-42028-9	—	—
9	May 30, 2025	978-4-575-42158-3	—	—
10	November 28, 2025	978-4-575-42292-4	—	—
11	June 30, 2026	978-4-575-42450-8	—	—
12	December 24, 2026	978-4-575-42581-9	—	—

=== Anime ===
An anime adaptation was announced on July 29, 2024, which was later confirmed to be a television series produced by Felix Film and directed by Hiroshi Tamada, with series composition handled by Akihiko Inari, characters designed by Yuta Ito, and music composed by Hiroaki Tsutsumi and Tsubasa Handa. The series aired from July 11 to September 26, 2025, on Tokyo MX and other networks. (Note: Tokyo MX listed the series premiere on July 10, 2025, at 25:00, which is effectively July 11 at 1:00 a.m. JST.) The opening theme song is "Junjō de Are" (純情であれ。; Be of Pure Heart), performed by Gakuto Kajiwara, while the ending theme song is "Hikaru Sasu Tobira" (光射す扉; The Door that Lets Light In), performed by ChouCho. Crunchyroll is streaming the series. Medialink licensed the series in Southeast Asia and Oceania (except Australia and New Zealand) for streaming on Ani-One Asia's YouTube channel.

==== Episodes ====
No.	Title	Directed by	Written by	Storyboarded by	Original release date (Note: Episodes are released on ABEMA, dAnime Store, Crunchyroll and Ani-One Asia 5 days before their televised airings.)
1	"Lloyd Is Cast Out"; Transliteration: "Roido, Tsuihō Sareru." (Japanese: ロイド、追放される。)	Hiroshi Tamada & Hironori Tanaka	Akihiko Inari	Hiroshi Tamada & Hironori Tanaka	July 11, 2025
Lloyd, a White Mage, is abruptly kicked from the Hero's adventuring party. In the past he lived with his master Merlin, who noted he had skill but lacked power. One day Lloyd accidentally touched a certain grimoire and passed out, confirming to Merlin Lloyd had potential as a Chosen One. As such she secretly cast a spell on Lloyd to make sure he was never cursed with overconfidence. She also began teaching him White Magic, intending that he should help others, while dissuading him from learning Ancient Magic. As White Magic is unsuitable for combat Lloyd was forced to find other uses for it; strengthening his body and avoiding monsters until he made it home. After several more years Lloyd left Merlin's house and joined an adventurer's party under the Hero Allen. This later turned out to have been thanks to one of Merlin's former party members manipulating Lloyd to ensure he didn't repeat the mistakes Merlin made in her youth. With his supporting White Magic Lloyd helps Allen win great victories, but Allen is too arrogant to notice and takes the first opportunity to kick Lloyd from the party. Being spelled to lack confidence, Lloyd accepts this and leaves. Later, a young adventurer hires Lloyd as her party desperately needs a White Mage.
2	"Lloyd is Recruited"; Transliteration: "Roido, Hirowareru." (Japanese: ロイド、拾われる。)	Michita Shiraishi	Takahiro Nagase	Hatsuki Tsuji	July 18, 2025
Lloyd meets party leader Yui, shield-bearer Daggas, Cross the archer and mage Silica, all S rank adventurers. Lloyd is confused when Yui's test of his abilities is simply to cast enhancement magic. Lloyd does so, casting five enhancement spells at once without an incantation, amazing them at his abilities and also baffling them at his unnatural lack of confidence. Learning his past with the hero Allen they are baffled he considered Lloyd a weak nuisance and conclude Allen must be an idiot. They explain to Lloyd their previous White Mage Klum had to retire to care for her sick sister Silvie, who is suffering from a disease turning her body into a magistone. Having heard of this disease from Merlin Lloyd asks to visit Klum and learns Silvie fell ill after being injured in a cave filled with magistone ore. This confirms his suspicion magistone mana entered her wounds. Inventing a new White spell he draws the mana out of Silvie then uses it to heal her already stone limbs at the same time. Klum is baffled as Lloyd is clearly the greatest White Mage she has ever seen. With Silvie cured Klum forms a party with her so they can adventure together again. Lloyd is invited to join Yui's party, surprising him at their enthusiasm.
3	"Lloyd Sets Out"; Transliteration: "Roido, Tabidatsu." (Japanese: ロイド、旅立つ。)	Yū Yabuuchi	Akihiko Inari	Hatsuki Tsuji	July 25, 2025
Lloyd's new friends are curious he describes Merlin as a Combat mage and not a White mage like him. Daggas explains they have accepted a job to stop monsters destroying farms. Lloyd is suspicious as the monster pack contains different species which never cooperate naturally. Lloyd proves useful by storing everyone's heavy equipment in his dimensional storage. Daggas points out the border with the Magocracy, the nation of Demons, which has a history of trying to conquer the entire continent. Camping for the night Yui and Silica are attacked by a basilisk while bathing. Lloyd distracts the basilisk and casts enhancement magic on them, allowing them to kill the basilisk far easier than they are used to. Lloyd manages to teach everyone dimensional storage, but blames their slow progress on him being a bad teacher. Yui apologises to Lloyd, feeling she forced him to join the party. She admits her own village was destroyed by monsters, so she feels compelled to protect innocent people when threatened by monsters. Spider monsters pass the area and they manage to defeat the ones that spot them. Lloyd feels shame he started giving orders in battle when Yui is the leader, but is surprised when they praise him for it. Lloyd wonders where the spiders were all going.
4	"Lloyd Gives Support"; Transliteration: "Roido, Shien Suru." (Japanese: ロイド、支援する。)	Tomohiko Niwa	Takahiro Nagase	Tomohiko Niwa	August 1, 2025
The others start to worry Lloyd is doing too much without letting them help him, including standing guard all night without sleep. They especially wonder why there is such a huge gap between Lloyd's high abilities and his low opinion of himself. Daggas finally asks why Lloyd can't trust them to help and Lloyd admits it simply never occurred to him, making Daggas truly curious what happened in Lloyd's past. Meanwhile, it is revealed the monster's strange behaviour is being orchestrated by a man named Lord Michelle to draw adventurers away from Ishtar city in preparation to attack. Lloyd detects hundreds of High Wolves infesting a farm, yet finds it strange it is the only location affected as every other monster for miles has simply disappeared. Cross spots a large black magistone Lloyd detects is filled with Beastfolk mana, a race of humanoids known to control animals with spells. With over 1000 monsters around the stone Cross destroys it with a Lloyd enhanced arrow. Free of the magistone the monsters rampage but with Lloyd's support magic his friends wipe out most of them. Having realised someone planned the monster rampages Lloyd insists they return to Ishtar as quickly as possible.
5	"Lloyd to the Rescue"; Transliteration: "Roido, Kyūshutsu Suru." (Japanese: ロイド、救出する。)	Shō Hamada	Akihiko Inari	Hatsuki Tsuji	August 8, 2025
Lloyd casts a spell to increase their running speed. Lord Michelle meets his accomplice Great General Grist, whose army is certain to conquer Ishtar using the powers of a kidnapped young woman. Lloyd's friends are confused how Lloyd can maintain their increased speed all day. Lloyd explains Merlin once dumped him in monster territory, forcing him to use magic constantly until he could maintain spells almost indefinitely. The party explain training like that is completely abnormal, but Lloyd misinterprets this to mean their training was much harder. Lloyd senses demons in an underground building using the same monster control magic from the farm. Using Earth Magic Silica collapses the ceiling on the demons. With the demons dead they rescue the kidnapped woman, a Beast-folk named Kureha capable of controlling monsters. She reveals the demons have been stealing her magic and storing it in magistones to lure monsters wherever they want them. Daggas confirms the attack on Ishtar must be the latest invasion attempt of the Magocracy. As they near Ishtar Lloyd senses monsters and a demon army approaching Ishtar. Lloyd has a sudden idea so he sends his friends onwards to warn Ishtar while he takes Kureha elsewhere to cause some chaos.
6	"Lloyd Frees Them"; Transliteration: "Roido, Kaihō Suru." (Japanese: ロイド、解放する。)	Ichizō Mashimo	Takahiro Nagase	Hatsuki Tsuji	August 15, 2025
In Ishtar Allen rages he can't find a replacement for Lloyd. The knights inform him of the monster army so Allen agrees to fight, hoping to impress the King. Lloyd finds more monsters heading for Ishtar. Allen is publicly humiliated when his party admits they are weaker without Lloyd, including him, only he was too arrogant to notice. Allen attacks his swordswoman Lina, but she easily stops him, revealing just how weak he has become. Allen flees with his party, except Lina who stays to defend Ishtar. Lloyd and Kureha find magistones among the monsters and begin neutralising them. Lina reveals to everyone Allen never would have become the Hero without Lloyd's support magic. The adventurers rush to defend Ishtar, trusting Lina's word that Lloyd will return soon. With the magistones neutralised Kureha sends the monsters away. Daggas, Cross, Yui and Silica reach Ishtar and join the struggling adventurers but eventually they begin to be overwhelmed. Lloyd and Kureha finally arrive and with Lloyd's enhancement magic Kureha sends the whole monster army away. Kureha admits her real name is Claire. Lloyd delays asking why she hid her name, since with the monsters gone someone sends stone golems to attack Ishtar instead.
7	"Lloyd Saves Ishtar"; Transliteration: "Roido, Ishutaru o Sukū." (Japanese: ロイド、イシュタルを救う。)	Hiromu Azuma, Shin Yamamoto & Tsutomu Murakami	Akihiko Inari	Hatsuki Tsuji	August 22, 2025
Michelle learns the monsters fled. Claire tries to send the golems away but due to demonic enhancements they ignore her. Lloyd and Claire reach Ishtar and learn Allen refused to fight. Lloyd heals a wound on Lina's arm but grows weak due to using magic continuously. Despite his exhaustion he casts enhancement magic on the army and the golems are destroyed. Michelle escapes, enraging Grist who swears to kill whoever was responsible. Lloyd sleeps for 24 hours but still blames his own weakness and refuses to accept thanks from Ishtar's citizens. Merlin learns what happened and starts to regret taking away Lloyd's self-confidence. Lloyd's friends force him to meet the citizens who declare him the new Hero of Ishtar. Allen decides to leave Ishtar with the remaining members of his party, though even they start to doubt him. Merlin and her former party discuss whether there are signs of the demon lord's return, even though they defeated him decades ago, losing their party member Sybil in the battle. Ishtar's Lord Abel summons Lloyd and his friends to reveal Claire is actually princess of the Forres Empire, home of the Beastfolk. As it is vital the demon's never capture her Abel asks Lloyd to escort her in secret to the human's capital city Sylphess where her family can safely retrieve her.
8	"Lloyd Stays at a Hot Spring"; Transliteration: "Roido, Onsen-chi ni Todomaru." (Japanese: ロイド、温泉地に留まる。)	Michita Shiraishi	Takahiro Naagase	Haruka Yoshinaga, Hiroshi Tamada & Hiroshi Mita	August 29, 2025
After ten days of travel the group rests at a hot spring village. Lloyd is concerned the closer they get to Sylphess the more likely demons will find them, so he decides they will stay for a few days while he makes necessary preparations. Daggas visits a weapon shop looking for a new shield and notices thugs led by A rank adventurer Galland have been trying to force the owner to sell them a particular weapon. The owner refuses, causing a fight in which Daggas throws them out. Silica, unhappy at how much she had to rely on Lloyd during the attack on Ishtar, practises her flame magic night and day trying to improve. Daggas comes across Silica training in the woods and reveals the shop owner possesses the greatshield Aegis, forged by the legendary blacksmith Lyoness. Due to its immense weight only a physically strong S rank warrior can aspire to use it, which is why he refused to sell it to Galland. Instead, he has offered to give it to Daggas for free if he discovers the source of unusual explosions from the forest scaring people. Silica apologises to the shop owner for her explosions and true to his word he grants Daggas the shield for free.
9	"The S-Rank Adventurers Strive to Get Stronger"; Transliteration: "Roido, Esu-ranku Bōkensha, Shōjin Suru." (Japanese: ロイド、Sランク冒険者、精進する。)	Hiromu Azuma	Takahiro Nagase	Ken'ichi Yatagai	September 5, 2025
Cross encounters a young archer named Lynn who impulsively asks to form a party as he is tired of being stuck at E Rank. Yui witnesses a noble from the Windy family threaten to execute a boy for getting mud on her dress, so she steps in. Cross takes Lynn to exterminate slimes and realises Lynn is the worst archer he has ever met. Yui's fight is interrupted by a powerful woman who knocks the guards unconscious while the noble faints. Yui asks the woman, Lilith, how she got so strong. Lilith, who knows Lloyd, offers to train Yui. Lloyd asks Claire about controlling monsters as he is certain it is ancient magic. Cross teaches Lynn to shoot a bow properly while Lilith teaches Yui to control blades made from mana for long range attacks. Claire explains ancient magic is taboo because it kills anyone who tries to use it if they weren't born with the talent. A monster tries to steal Lynn's slimes but Cross invents a way of firing arrows faster than before, killing it. Lynn learns to be more confident. Yui uses her new spell to save Lilith when a monster attacks. With everyone having grown stronger they continue to Sylphess. Lilith, really named Lily, returns to Merlin who is jealous Lily was able to see Lloyd and she wasn't.
10	"Lloyd Fights"; Transliteration: "Roido, Tatakau." (Japanese: ロイド、戦う。)	Shō Hamada	Akihiko Inari	Hatsuki Tsuji	September 12, 2025
Grist reports Ishtar's survival to his master who demands he find Claire. Michelle atones by providing Grist with Claire's location. Lloyd's friends try to convince him to believe in himself. Lloyd promises to try but continues to think he isn't really that strong. Merlin visits her old party member Lowen in the Empire and learns the Magocracy is currently ruled by the Demon Lord's son. Merlin provides Lowen with half the Grimoire Lloyd touched to see if it still has the power to seal a Demon Lord. On the road the group encounters a demonic mist that interferes with all magic, so they rush to reach Schwertz village. Lowen confirms the Grimoire has traces of Sybil's magic, and if Lloyd was able to resonate with it he must have Chosen One potential. Merlin fears that while she was an excellent master for Lloyd she was a lousy mother and failed to prepare him for real life. The mist leads the group into Grist's trap. They are saved by Therion the Ice Hero, Claire's childhood friend, while Merlin's friend takes on Michelle to stop him generating more mist, but Michelle just runs away again. Grist attacks Therion in a massive explosion and manages to kidnap Claire in the chaos.
11	"Lloyd Flies!"; Transliteration: "Roido, Tobu!" (Japanese: ロイド、飛ぶ!)	Tomohiko Niwa & Shō Hamada	Akihiko Inari	Tomohiko Niwa	September 19, 2025
Grist escapes on his airship. Therion insists on following as quickly as possible, only to be thoroughly scolded by everybody for his temper, arrogance and lack of a plan. Michelle resents having to put his airship at risk when it is powered by a valuable fragment of the previous demon lord's body. Lloyd and the others reach the ship using a reverse-gravity spell Lloyd quickly invented. Grist attacks them but Therion freezes then shatters his left arm, revealing Lloyd worked out the trick to his impenetrable magic barrier. Grist's barrier only activates for attacks he can sense coming, so Lloyd invented a new, passive attack spell for Therion that froze Grist's arm using super chilled air instead of ice. Grist desperately releases all Michelle's captured monsters. Therion retrieves Claire who calms the monsters with her power. Due to some strange resonance her voice destabilises the demon lord fragment which absorbs Grist and the monsters, turning them into a demonic chimera. Michelle is amazed by the research possibilities of studying such a monster, but is immediately killed by it. Merlin and Lowen meet Merlin's friend, Will, with news of Lloyd fighting Grist and Michelle. With the power source gone the airship begins to fall and no one can escape with the chimera blocking the exit.
12	"Lloyd is Aware He Lacks Power"; Transliteration: "Roido, Jitsuryou Busoku o Jikaku Suru" (Japanese: ロイド、実力不足を自覚する。)	Shō Hamada	Akihiko Inari	Hatsuki Tsuji & Hironori Tanaka	September 26, 2025
Merlin teleports nearby with Will. Lloyd moves the chimera with gravity magic, letting everyone jump from the ship. Lloyd realises the demon lord fragment is seeking a vessel, meaning it must be chasing Claire. Lloyd has Claire sing to the fragment hoping she can separate the chimera back into individual monsters. Merlin reveals herself, refusing to let Lloyd mess with ancient magic. Lloyd claims thanks to his friends he knows the limits of his abilities now. Merlin decides to trust him. Claire sings and the chimera separates. Unfortunately, a portal opens from Lloyd using ancient magic and pulls him inside. Sybil's voice warns Lloyd the ancient peoples realised their magic to rewrite reality would only causes chaos, so they sealed it away, only granting it to a select few people every generation while cursing anyone else who tried to use it. Lloyd realises this is what happened to Sybil, who admits in his battle with the demon lord Merlin and their party were killed, so he used ancient magic to revive them at the cost of his own life. With Sybil's help and his friend's support Lloyd escapes the portal. Everyone realises Lloyd's lack of confidence came from struggling to surpass Merlin, the greatest living Sage. The King rewards their party with a mansion in the capital. Lloyd informs Merlin he wishes to learn magic other than support magic to help his party on future adventures.

== See also ==
- I Became a Legend After My 10 Year-Long Last Stand, another light novel series with the same illustrator
