= I Want to End This Love Game =

Japanese manga series

- First tankōbon volume cover, featuring Yukiya Asagi (left) and Miku Sakura (right)

愛してるゲームを終わらせたい (Aishiteru Gēmu o Owarasetai)
- Genre: Romantic comedy
- Manga
- Written by: Yuki Domoto
- Published by: Shogakukan
- English publisher: NA: Viz Media
- Imprint: Shōnen Sunday Comics Special
- Magazine: Sunday Webry
- Original run: December 24, 2021 – present
- Volumes: 9
- Anime television series
- Directed by: Azuma Tani
- Written by: Keiichirō Ōchi
- Music by: Akito Matsuda
- Studio: Felix Film
- Licensed by: Crunchyroll
- Original network: Tokyo MX, MBS, BS Asahi
- Original run: April 14, 2026 – June 30, 2026
- Episodes: 12
- icon

I Want to End This Love Game (Japanese: 愛してるゲームを終わらせたい, Hepburn: Aishiteru Gēmu o Owarasetai) is a Japanese web manga series written and illustrated by Yuki Domoto. It has been serialized on Shogakukan's online platform Sunday Webry since December 2021. An anime television series adaptation produced by Felix Film aired from April to June 2026.

== Plot ==
Yukiya Asagi and Miku Sakura are childhood friends that began a game when they were in the sixth grade, in which they both must say "I love you" to each other, with the one who gets flustered losing. Four years later and the game has continued even in high school. Though they continuously say "I love you" to each other for fun, the two have secretly developed feelings for each other, but both fear it may be too late for them to confess.

== Characters ==
Yukiya Asagi (浅葱 優希也, Asagi Yukiya)
Voiced by: Kaito Ishikawa (Japanese); Nicholas Markgraf, Rachel Glass (young) (English)
A usually stoic, but secretly caring, high school boy, and Miku's childhood friend; the two have been close for a long time. Like Miku, he has had a deep crush on her since they were children, but he constantly becomes irritated by Miku beating him in their game. Eventually, he confesses to her for real and they begin dating.
Miku Sakura (桜 みく, Sakura Miku)
Voiced by: Miku Itō (Japanese); Giovannie Cruz, Nia Celeste (young) (English)
A popular and playful high school girl, and Yukiya's childhood friend. She has had feelings for him since they were children and is fond of teasing him when they do their love game. She also confesses to him for real and becomes his girlfriend.
Wakana Asagi (浅葱 若菜, Asagi Wakana)
Voiced by: Wakana Maruoka (Japanese); Rebecca Danae (English)
Yukiya's younger sister. She is an enthusiast of shōjo manga.
Masaru Shinonome (東雲 匡琉, Shinonome Masaru)
Voiced by: Takehito Koyasu (Japanese); Ian Sinclair (English)
Yukiya's uncle, who runs a cafe. He sometimes gives love advice to Yukiya regarding his feelings for Miku.
Hinako Hanaba (花葉 雛子, Hanaba Hinako)
Voiced by: Yui Ogura (Japanese); Sara Ragsdale (English)
Natsuki Moegi (萌木 菜月, Moegi Natsuki)
Voiced by: Kaede Hondo

== Media ==
=== Manga ===
Written and illustrated by Yuki Domoto, I Want to End This Love Game began serialization in Shogakukan's online platform Sunday Webry on December 24, 2021. Shogakukan has collected its chapters into individual tankōbon volumes. The first volume was released on April 12, 2022. As of June 12, 2026, nine volumes have been released.

In June 2023, Viz Media announced that they had licensed the manga for an English release in North America, releasing the first English volume in February 2024.

==== Volumes ====
No.	Original release date	Original ISBN	English release date	English ISBN
1	April 12, 2022	978-4-09-851047-4	February 13, 2024	978-1-9747-4276-9
Game 1: "Childhood Friends Don't Want to Lose" (幼なじみは負けたくない, Osananajimi wa Maketakunai); Game 2: "Childhood Friends Are Hard to Get Close To" (幼なじみはなじみにくい, Osananajimi wa Najimi Nikui); Game 3: "Childhood Friends Cook Together" (幼なじみは料理をする, Osananajimi wa Ryōri o Suru); Game 4: "Childhood Friends Are Connected" (幼なじみは繋がってる, Osananajimi wa Tsunagatteru); Game 5: "Childhood Friends Extend an Invite" (幼なじみは誘いをかける, Osananajimi wa Sasoi o Kakeru); Game 6: "Childhood Friends Go on a Date" (幼なじみはデートをする, Osananajimi wa Dēto o Suru); Game 7: "Childhood Friends Push Themselves" (幼なじみは背伸びをする, Osananajimi wa Senobi o Suru); Bonus Game: "Childhood Friends Graduate" (幼なじみは卒業する, Osananajimi wa Sotsugyō Suru)
2	August 12, 2022	978-4-09-851220-1	May 14, 2024	978-1-9747-4553-1
Game 8: "Childhood Friends Can Do Anything" (幼なじみはなんでもする, Osananajimi wa Nandemo suru); Game 9: "Childhood Friends Can't Do Anything" (幼なじみは何もできない, Osananajimi wa Nani mo Dekinai); Game 10: "Childhood Friends Write Notes" (幼なじみは手書きする, Osananajimi wa Tegaki suru); Game 11: "Childhood Friends Come Over in the Morning" (幼なじみは朝に来る, Osananajimi wa Asa ni Kuru); Game 12: "Childhood Friends Worry" (幼なじみは心配する, Osananajimi wa Shinpai suru); Game 13: "Childhood Friends Want to Take the Next Step" (幼なじみは踏み込みたい, Osananajimi wa Fumikomitai); Game 14: "Childhood Friends Stay the Night" (幼なじみは泊まりたい, Osananajimi wa Tomaritai); Game 15: "Childhood Friends Are Under One Roof" (幼なじみは一つ屋根の下, Osananajimi wa Hitotsu Yane no Shita); Special Game: "Childhood Friends Want to Feed Each Other" (幼なじみは食べさせたい, Osananajimi wa Tabesasetai); Extra Game 1: "Childhood Friends Lie" (幼なじみは嘘をつく, Osananajimi wa usowotsuku); Extra Game 2: "Childhood Friends Are Hit with Nostalgia" (幼なじみはなつかしい, Osananajimi wa Natsukashī); Extra Game 3: "Childhood Friends Are Polar Opposites" (幼なじみは差をつける, Osananajimi wa Sa o Tsukeru); Bonus Game: "Childhood Friends Want to Stay Close" (幼なじみは傍にいたい, Osananajimi wa Hata ni Itai)
3	December 12, 2022	978-4-09-851525-7	August 13, 2024	978-1-9747-4627-9
Game 16: "Childhood Friends Want to Settle the Score" (幼なじみは勝負を決めたい, Osananajimi wa Shōbu o kimetai); Game 17: "Childhood Friends Want to Be Honest" (幼なじみは素直になりたい, Osananajimi wa Sunao ni naritai); Game 18: "Childhood Friends Can't End It" (幼なじみは終わらせない, Osananajimi wa Owarasenai); Extra Game 4: "Childhood Friends Greet the Day" (幼なじみは朝を迎える, Osananajimi wa Asa o Mukaeru); Extra Game 5: "Childhood Friends and the Toiletry Bag" (幼なじみとお泊まりセット, Osananajimi to Otomari Setto); Game 19: "Childhood Friends, Plus...?" (幼なじみは、他にも。。。？, Osananajimi wa, Hoka ni mo?); Game 20: "Childhood Friends and the Student Council President" (幼なじみと生徒会長, Osananajimi to Seito Kaichō); Game 21: "Childhood Friends Become Master and Pupil?" (幼なじみは師弟になる？, Osananajimi wa Shitei ni naru?); Game 22: "Childhood Friends Make a Decision" (幼なじみは決意する, Osananajimi wa Ketsui suru); Game 23: "Childhood Friends Suddenly..." (幼なじみは突然。。。する, Osananajimi wa Totsuzen... suru)
4	May 12, 2023	978-4-09-852059-6	November 12, 2024	978-1-9747-4925-6
Game 24: "Childhood Friends Can't Stop" (幼なじみは止められない, Osananajimi wa Tomerarenai); Game 25: "Childhood Friends Aren't Cute?" (幼なじみは可愛くない…?, Osananajimi wa Kawaikunai...?); Game 26: "Childhood Friends Take Off Running" (幼なじみは走り出す, Osananajimi wa Hashiridasu); Game 27: "Childhood Friends Are Too Kind" (幼なじみは優しすぎる, Osananajimi wa Yasashisugiru); Game 28: "Childhood Friends Hug" (幼なじみは抱きしめる, Osananajimi wa Dakishimeru); Game 29: "Childhood Friends Are a Little Weird" (幼なじみはちょっとおかしい, Osananajimi wa Chotto Okashī); Game 30: "Childhood Friend Who's Just an Innocent Girl" (幼なじみは乙女ですから, Osananajimi wa Otome desu kara); Game 31: "Childhood Friend... and My Boyfriend?" (幼なじみが…彼氏だったら, Osananajimi ga... Kareshi dattara); Game 32: "Childhood Friends Try... Dating?" (幼なじみは付き合ってみる。。。？, Osananajimi wa Tsukiatte Miru...?)
5	December 12, 2023	978-4-09-853053-3	February 11, 2025	978-1-9747-5184-6
Game 33: "Childhood Friends Stay on the Phone" (幼なじみは繋いだままで, Osananajimi wa Tsunaida mama de); Game 34: "Childhood Friends Do Their Best" (幼なじみは頑張りたい, Osananajimi wa Ganbaritai); Game 35: "Childhood Friends Want to Share" (幼なじみは共有したい, Osananajimi wa Kyōyū shitai); Game 36: "Childhood Friends Are Malfunctioning" (幼なじみはバグってる, Osananajimi wa Bagutteru); Game 37: "Childhood Friends Accept Everything" (幼なじみは受け止める, Osananajimi wa Uketomeru); Game 38: "Childhood Friends Go Out in Secret" (幼なじみは秘密で付き合う, Osananajimi wa Himitsu de Tsukiau); Game 39: "Childhood Friends Try to Mingle" (幼なじみは交ざってみる, Osananajimi wa Mazattemiru); Game 40: "Childhood Friends… Lovers…" (幼なじみは恋人に…, Osananajimi wa Koibito ni...)
6	April 10, 2024	978-4-09-853254-4	May 13, 2025	978-1-9747-5483-0
Game 41: "Childhood Friends Always Watched" (幼なじみはずっと見てきた, Osananajimi wa Zutto Mitekita); Game 42: "Childhood Friends Alone in a Room Together" (幼なじみは部屋で二人で, Osananajimi wa Heya de Futari de); Game 43: "Childhood Friends and the Last Day" (幼なじみと最後の一日, Osananajimi to Saigo no Tsuitachi); Game 44: "Childhood Friends Feel the Same Way" (幼なじみは同じ気持ちで, Osananajimi wa Onaji Kimochi de); Game 45: "Childhood Friends Won't Run" (幼なじみは逃げ出さない, Osananajimi wa Nigedasanai); Game 46: "Childhood Friends Wants to Be a Cheerleader" (幼なじみは応援したい, Osananajimi wa Ōen Shitai); Game 47: "Childhood Friends Want to Win, After All" (幼なじみは勝ちたいから, Osananajimi wa Kachitai kara); Game 48: "Childhood Friends Won't Show Off" (幼なじみはかっこつけない, Osananajimi wa Kakko Tsukenai); Game 49: "Childhood Friends Show their Resolve" (幼なじみは覚悟を決める, Osananajimi wa Kakugo o Kimeru); Extra Game 6: "Childhood Friends Fold" (幼なじみは折り重ねる, Osananajimi wa Orikasaneru)
7	June 18, 2025	978-4-09-854124-9	July 14, 2026	978-1-9747-5552-3
Game 50: "Childhood Friends Want to Help Them Win" (幼なじみは勝たせたい, Osananajimi wa Katasetai); Game 51: "Childhood Friends Aren't Like That" (幼なじみはキャラじゃない, Osananajimi wa Kyara ja nai); Game 52: "Childhood Friends Won't Quit" (幼なじみはやめてあげない, Osananajimi wa Yamete Agenai); Game 53: "Childhood Friends Try Getting Greedy" (幼なじみは欲張ってみる, Osananajimi wa Yokubatte Miru); Game 54: "Childhood Friends Want to Change" (幼なじみは変わりたい, Osananajimi wa Kawaritai); Game 55: "Childhood Friends Won't Waste It" (幼なじみは無駄にしない, Osananajimi wa Mudanishinai); Game 56: "Childhood Friends Pass the Baton" (幼なじみはバトンを繋ぐ, Osananajimi wa Baton o Tsunagu); Bonus Game 7: 幼なじみは報告する (Osananajimi wa Hōkoku suru); Special Game: コミックス発売記念特別編 (Komikkusu Hatsubai Kinen Tokubetsu-hen)
8	April 10, 2026	978-4-09-854509-4	—	—
Game 57: "Childhood Friends Start" (幼なじみはスタートする, Osananajimi wa Sutāto suru); Game 58: "Childhood Friends Dash Through" (幼なじみは駆け抜ける, Osananajimi wa Kake Nukeru); Game 59: "Childhood Friends Want to Confess" (幼なじみは告白したい, Osananajimi wa Kokuhaku shitai); Game 60: "Childhood Friends Confess" (幼なじみは告白する, Osananajimi wa Kokuhaku suru); Game 61: "Childhood Friends Are Boyfriend and Girlfriend" (幼なじみは彼氏と彼女, Osananajimi wa Kareshi to Kanojo); Game 62: "Childhood Friends Are Impatient" (幼なじみはもどかしい, Osananajimi wa Modokashī); Special Game: "Childhood Friends Get an Anime" (幼なじみはアニメ化する, Osananajimi wa Anime-ka suru)
9	June 11, 2026	978-4-09-854643-5	—	—
Game 63: "Childhood Friends Continue the Game" (幼なじみはゲームを続けてる, Osananajimi wa Gēmu o Tsuzuketeru); Game 64: "Childhood Friends Speak Their Mind" (幼なじみは本音を言う, Osananajimi wa Honne o Iu); Game 65: "Childhood Friends Go to the Beach" (幼なじみは海へ行く, Osananajimi wa Umi e Iku); Game 66: "Childhood Friends' Have 3 Minutes" (幼なじみの3分間, Osananajimi no 3-funkan); Game 67: "Childhood Friends' Return Trip" (幼なじみの帰り道, Osananajimi no Kaerimichi); Game 68: "Childhood Friends Make a Proposal" (幼なじみは申し出る, Osananajimi wa Mōshideru); Precious Game: みくへ (Miku he)

=== Anime ===
In June 2025, it was announced that the manga would receive an anime television series adaptation. It was produced by Felix Film and directed by Azuma Tani, with series composition and screenplays handled by Keiichirō Ōchi, characters designed by Yūki Fukuchi, and music composed by Akito Matsuda. It was broadcast for 12 episodes from April 14 to June 30, 2026, on Tokyo MX and other networks. The opening theme song is "Kimi no Sei de Aishiteru" (君のせいで愛してる; lit. 'It's Your Fault that I Love You'), performed by CHiCO with HoneyWorks, and the ending theme song is "Little World" (リトルワールド, Ritoru Wārudo), performed by Pompadolls. Crunchyroll is streaming the series.

==== Episodes ====
No.	Title	Directed by (Note: Production staff information is taken from the ending credits of each episode.)	Written by	Storyboarded by	Original release date
1	"My Childhood Friend Refuses to Accept Defeat"; Transliteration: "Osananajimi wa Maketakunai" (Japanese: 幼なじみは負けたくない)	Azuma Tani	Keiichirō Ōchi	Azuma Tani	April 14, 2026
2	"My Childhood Friend Cooks"; Transliteration: "Osananajimi wa Ryōri suru" (Japanese: 幼なじみは料理する)	Kiyoshi Murayama	Keiichirō Ōchi	Azuma Tani	April 21, 2026
3	"Childhood Friend Seduction"; Transliteration: "Osananajimi wa Sasoi o Kakeru" (Japanese: 幼なじみは誘いをかける)	Azuma Tani	Keiichirō Ōchi	Azuma Tani	April 28, 2026
4	"My Childhood Friend Will Do Anything"; Transliteration: "Osananajimi wa Nandemo suru" (Japanese: 幼なじみはなんでもする)	Kanta Shiba	Keiichirō Ōchi	Azuma Tani	May 5, 2026
5	"My Childhood Friend Comes in the Morning"; Transliteration: "Osananajimi wa Asa ni Kuru" (Japanese: 幼なじみは朝に来る)	Yasuhira Kido	Mie Kaga	Azuma Tani	May 12, 2026
6	"My Childhood Friend Wants to Sleep Over"; Transliteration: "Osananajimi wa Tomaritai" (Japanese: 幼なじみは泊まりたい)	Daishō Miyagi	Keiichirō Ōchi	Azuma Tani	May 19, 2026
7	"My Childhood Friend Wants to Win"; Transliteration: "Osananajimi wa Shōbu o Kimetai" (Japanese: 幼なじみは勝負を決めたい)	Azuma Tani	Mie Kaga	Azuma Tani	May 26, 2026
8	"My Childhood Friend and the Student Council President"; Transliteration: "Osananajimi to Seito Kaichō" (Japanese: 幼なじみと生徒会長)	Kanta Shiba	Keiichirō Ōchi	Azuma Tani	June 2, 2026
9	"My Childhood Friend Becomes My Apprentice?"; Transliteration: "Osananajimi wa Shitei ni Naru?" (Japanese: 幼なじみは師弟になる？)	Akesada Kanikubo	Mie Kaga	Azuma Tani	June 9, 2026
10	"My Childhood Friend Is Unstoppable"; Transliteration: "Osananajimi wa Tomerarenai" (Japanese: 幼なじみは止められない)	Weilun Shi	Mie Kaga	Azuma Tani	June 16, 2026
11	"My Childhood Friend Embraces Me"; Transliteration: "Osananajimi wa Dakishimeru" (Japanese: 幼なじみは抱きしめる)	Mineya Mori	Keiichirō Ōchi	Azuma Tani	June 23, 2026
12	"My Childhood Friend is Girly"; Transliteration: "Osananajimi wa Otome Desu kara" (Japanese: 幼なじみは乙女ですから)	Azuma Tani	Keiichirō Ōchi	Azuma Tani	June 30, 2026

== Reception ==
The series was nominated for the 2022 Next Manga Award in the web manga category; it ranked 12th in the 2023 edition in the same category.
