= Soara and the House of Monsters =

Japanese manga series

- Japanese cover for volume 1, featuring Soara

ソアラと魔物の家 (Soara to Mamono no Ie)
- Genre: Fantasy, adventure
- Manga
- Written by: Hidenori Yamaji
- Published by: Shogakukan
- English publisher: NA: Seven Seas Entertainment
- Imprint: Sunday Webry Comics
- Magazine: Shōnen Sunday S; Sunday Webry
- Original run: November 25, 2021 – present
- Volumes: 7
- Anime television series
- Directed by: Takaharu Ozaki
- Written by: Ayumu Hisao
- Music by: Hinako Tsubakiyama
- Studio: Felix Film
- Original run: 2027 – scheduled
- icon

Soara and the House of Monsters (Japanese: ソアラと魔物の家, Hepburn: Soara to Mamono no Ie) is a Japanese fantasy adventure manga series written and illustrated by Hidenori Yamaji. Shogakukan publishes it since November 2021 in their magazine Shōnen Sunday S and on their webcomic platform Sunday Webry, and also releases it in collected tankōbon volumes. These have since September 2023 been released in English by Seven Seas Entertainment. An anime television series adaptation produced by Felix Film is set to premiere in 2027.

The story follows the human woman Soara, who after the end of a war between monsters and humans joins a group of travelling dwarf architects who build houses for various types of monsters. It was nominated for the Next Manga Award for best web manga in 2022 and 2023, and was well received for its artwork of monster houses and its themes of prejudice and understanding.

== Plot ==
Soara and the House of Monsters is a fantasy adventure story following Soara (ソアラ), an orphan who has been trained to fight in the war between humans and monsters, but is left without a purpose and home when peace is declared just as she becomes old enough to be a knight. Wandering aimlessly, she encounters a group of traveling dwarf architects led by Kirik (キリク, Kiriku), who renovate and build dream homes for monsters, such as goblins, slimes, and dragons. Soara is distrustful of monsters, but is moved by the architects' work, and joins them in their travels.

== Characters ==
Soara (ソアラ)
Voiced by: Ikumi Hasegawa
Krik (キリク, Kiriku)
Voiced by: Ayumu Murase
Niko (ニコ)
Voiced by: Reiji Kawashima
Ganshō (ガンショウ)
Voiced by: Kenta Miyake

== Production ==
Soara and the House of Monsters is written and drawn by Hidenori Yamaji, who originally created the series from a desire to combine the fantasy genre with something relatable to readers. He considered housing as a theme to be simultaneously unusual in fantasy manga, and something very familiar to readers, so he chose to write a story about architecture with fantasy elements. When drawing the artwork, Yamaji focused on drawing houses that not only were entertaining and exciting to look at, but that also were structured in a believable way, that would have made sense for the monsters if they were real. To help reader better visualize the houses, he chose to draw detailed cross-sections of them.

== Media ==
=== Manga ===
The manga is serialized by Shogakukan since November 25, 2021, both in their monthly shōnen manga magazine Shōnen Sunday S and on their webcomic platform Sunday Webry. Shogakukan also publishes the series in collected tankōbon volumes since May 12, 2022, under their imprint Sunday Webry Comics; since September 5, 2023, these have been released in English by Seven Seas Entertainment and in Chinese by Tong Li Publishing.

==== Volumes ====
No.	Original release date	Original ISBN	English release date	English ISBN
1	May 12, 2022	978-4-09-851048-1	September 5, 2023	979-8-88843-018-7
1. "The House of Monsters" (魔物の家, Mamono no Ie); 2. "The Goblins' House" (ゴブリンの家, Goburin no Ie); 3. "Traveling Companions" (旅は道連れ, Tabi wa Michizure); 4. "The Slime's House" (スライムの家, Suraimu no Ie); 5. "The House of Forbidden Love" (禁断の恋の家, Kindan no Koi no Ie)
2	November 10, 2022	978-4-09-851354-3	February 6, 2024	979-8-88843-382-9
6. "From Architects to... Pirates?" (建築士→海賊…?, Kenchikushi → Kaizoku...?); 7. "The House of True Love" (真実の愛の家, Shinjitsu no Ai no Ie); 8. "The Demon Lord's Castle" (魔王の城, Maō no Shiro); 9. "The Demon Lord's House" (魔王の家, Maō no Ie); 10. "The Precious Home" (大切な家, Taisetsu na Ie); 11. "The House on the Horizon" (目指すべき家, Mezasu beki Ie)
3	July 12, 2023	978-4-09-852541-6	July 9, 2024	979-8-88843-802-2
12. "The Cats of the Lost Woods" (迷いの森と猫, Mayoi no Mori to Neko); 13. "The Cats' Resolve" (猫の心意気, Neko no Kokoroiki); 14. "The Strongest Kitchen" (最強のキッチン, Saikyō no Kitchin); 15. "The Cats' Restaurant" (猫のレストラン, Neko no Resutoran); 16. "Building a Foundation" (築かれていくもの, Kizukarete Iku Mono); 17. "The Green Gnomes and the Earth Giant" (緑の小人と土の巨人, Midori no Kobito to Tsuchi no Kyōjin); 18. "The House of Green and Earth" (緑と土の家, Midori to Tsuchi no Ie)
4	May 10, 2024	978-4-09853-305-3	January 14, 2025	979-8-89160-660-9
19. "What Did You Do?" (壊したのか？, Kowashita no Ka?); 20. "Origin Story" (始まりの話, Hajimari no Hanashi); 21. "The Two Blacksmiths" (始まりの二人, Hajimari no Futari); 22. "The Capital" (王都にて, Ōto Nite); 23. "Worth" (それぞれの価値, Sorezore no Kachi); 24. "The Real Deal" (本物, Honmono); 25. "Pest" (厄介者, Yakkaimono)
5	January 10, 2025	978-4-09853-823-2	August 5, 2025	979-8-89561-716-8
26. "Bro" (兄貴, Aniki); 27. "Defending the Capital" (王都防衛線, Ōto Hōeisen); 28. "What For?" (何が為に, Nani ga Tameni); 29. "The Things I've Crafted" (造ってきたもの, Tsukutte Kita Mono); 30. "Farewell" (別れ, Wakare); 31. "What I Want to Build" (築きたいもの, Kizukitai Mono); 32. "Breaking Out of Your Shell" (殻を破る, Kara o Yaburu)
6	October 10, 2025	978-4-09854-303-8	May 26, 2026	979-8-89765-362-1
33. "Sora Tei e no Michi" (空帝への道; "The Road to the Sky Emperor"); 34. "Sora no Tobi Kata" (空の飛び方; "How to Fly in the Sky); 35. "Doragon no Sumu Shima" (ドラゴンの住む島; "The Island Where the Dragon Dwells"); 36. "Ikareru Sora Tei" (怒れる空帝; "The Wrathful Sky Emperor); 37. "Doragon no Nedoko" (ドラゴンの寝床; "The Dragon's Sleeping Place"); 38. "Gomi to Takara" (ゴミと宝; "Trash and Treasure"); 39. "Doragon o Iyasu Mono" (ドラゴンを癒すもの; "That Which Soothes the Dragon")
7	August 10, 2026	978-4-09854-734-0	—	—

=== Anime ===
An anime television series adaptation was announced on July 1, 2026. The series will be produced by Felix Film and directed by Takaharu Ozaki, with series composition handled by Ayumu Hisao, characters designed by Tomoko Iwasa, and music composed by Hinako Tsubakiyama. It is set to premiere in 2027.

== Reception ==
Soara and the House of Monsters was nominated for the Next Manga Award in the Best Web Manga category in 2022 and 2023, and for the Japan Society and Anime NYC's first American Manga Awards in the Best New Manga category in 2024.

The manga has been well received by critics. Christopher Farris and Rebecca Silverman, both writing for Anime News Network, appreciated its themes of prejudice and understanding how all living things share in basic needs and comforts, without feeling too heavy-handed in its delivery. Farris found it refreshing to see a new take on the fantasy genre, with appealing and "hog-wild" house designs, and fun solutions to their problems, although felt a disconnect in the "before-and-after" visuals due to the monsters' homes often being demolished and rebuilt rather than renovated; Silverman also liked the artwork, calling it a "triumph of fantasy building". The Japanese entertainment news site Magmix also enjoyed the art of the houses, calling them "fantastic and powerful", and good at immersing the reader in the setting.

== See also ==
- Marry Grave, another manga series by Hidenori Yamaji
