= Riichi =

- Gender: Male

Origin
- Origin: Japanese
- Meaning: Different meanings depending on the kanji used

Riichi (written: 利一 or 理一) is a masculine Japanese given name. Notable people with the name include:

- Riichi Sekiyama (関山 利一; 1909–1970), Japanese Go player
- Riichi Takeshita (武下 利一; born 1989), Japanese badminton player
- Riichi Ueshiba (植芝 理一; born 1969), Japanese manga artist
- Riichi Yokomitsu (横光 利一; 1898–1947), Japanese writer

== Fictional character ==
- Riichi Miura (三浦 理一), a character from the manga and anime The Ancient Magus' Bride

== See also ==
- Japanese Mahjong, or Rīchi mahjong
