= Peridot (manga) =

Japanese manga series

- First tankōbon volume cover
- Genre: Action
- Manga
- Written by: Hiyoko Kobayashi
- Published by: Kodansha
- Magazine: Young Magazine Uppers
- Original run: 1999 – 2001
- Volumes: 6

Peridot (stylized in all caps) is a Japanese manga series written and illustrated by Hiyoko Kobayashi. It was serialized in Kodansha's seinen manga magazine Young Magazine Uppers from 1999 to 2001, with its chapters collected in six tankōbon volumes.

== Publication ==
Written and illustrated by Hiyoko Kobayashi, Peridot was serialized in Kodansha's seinen manga magazine Young Magazine Uppers from 1999 to 2001. Kodansha collected its chapters in six tankōbon volumes, released from November 9, 1999, to December 26, 2001. A one-shot chapter was published in Weekly Young Magazine on June 14, 2010, for the celebration of the magazine's 30th anniversary.

== See also ==
- Oku-sama wa Joshi Kōsei, another manga series by the same author
- Hantsu × Trash, another manga series by the same author
