= Oku-sama wa Joshi Kōsei =

Japanese manga series

- First tankōbon volume cover

おくさまは女子高生
- Manga
- Written by: Hiyoko Kobayashi
- Published by: Shueisha
- Imprint: Young Jump Comics
- Magazine: Young Jump Zōkan Mankaku (2001); Weekly Young Jump (2001–2007)
- Original run: January 11, 2001 – March 15, 2007
- Volumes: 13
- Video game
- Developer: Datam Polystar
- Platform: PlayStation 2, Dreamcast (Director's Edition)
- Released: June 20, 2002 (PS2); November 21, 2002 (DC)
- Anime television series
- Directed by: Jun Shishido
- Produced by: Yoshihito Takaya
- Written by: Hideo Takayashiki
- Music by: Kei Wakakusa
- Studio: Madhouse (Note: Animation production assistance (アニメーション制作協力) for all episodes provided by Imagin.)
- Original network: TV Kanagawa, TV Saitama
- Original run: July 2, 2005 – September 24, 2005
- Episodes: 13
- icon

Oku-sama wa Joshi Kōsei (おくさまは女子高生; lit. 'My Wife is a High School Girl') is a Japanese manga series written and illustrated by Hiyoko Kobayashi. It started in the supplementary edition of Shueisha's seinen manga magazine Weekly Young Jump, Young Jump Zōkan Mankaku in January 2001, and transferred to the main magazine in October of the same year, concluding in March 2007. Its chapters were collected in 13 volumes. The series centers on a couple whose age difference makes it difficult for them to further their relationship, as one is a high school girl and the other is her physics teacher.

A video game based on the series was released for the PlayStation 2 and later the Dreamcast as a "Director's Edition", both in 2002. A 13-episode anime television series adaptation, produced by Avex Entertainment and Madhouse, was broadcast from July to September 2005, with each episode composed of two mini-episodes.

== Plot ==
Asami Onohara (小野原 麻美, Onohara Asami) is a 17-year-old high-school student (voiced by Ayako Kawasumi) with a secret which has not been revealed to anyone: she is already married. Her husband, Kyosuke Ichimaru (市丸 恭介, Ichimaru Kyōsuke) (voiced by Mitsuaki Madono), is a physics teacher in the same high school as her. However, even though they are officially a married couple, Asami's father forbids them to have any sexual contact until after Asami has graduated. Asami has to hide the fact that she is married to Kyosuke while trying desperately to further their relationship, and it does not help when there are so many obstacles from her father and other third parties.

== Media ==
=== Manga ===
Written and illustrated by Hiyoko Kobayashi, Oku-sama wa Joshi Kōsei debuted in the supplementary edition of Shueisha's seinen manga magazine Weekly Young Jump, Young Jump Zōkan Mankaku on January 11, 2001. It was later transferred to the main magazine on October 4, 2001, (Note: Serialization in Weekly Young Jump started in the 44th issue of 2001, released on October 4, 2001.) and finished on March 15, 2007. (Note: The final chapter was published in the magazine's eighth issue of 2007 (released on January 25), and an additional chapter was published in the fifteenth issue of that same year (released on March 15).) Shueisha first released a limited tankōbon volume on June 20, 2002, and started publishing it in wideban volumes on November 20 of the same year. The thirteenth and last volume was published on June 20, 2007.

=== Anime ===
A 13-episode anime television series adaptation, produced by Avex Entertainment and animated by Madhouse, was broadcast on Television Kanagawa, TV Saitama, and other JAITS stations from July 3 to September 25, 2005. (Note: Television Kanagawa and TV Saitama premiered the series on July 2, 2005, at 25:30, which is effectively July 3 at 1:30 a.m. JST.)

==== Episodes ====
No.	Title	Directed by	Written by	Original release date
1	"To Everyone in Secret..."; Transliteration: "Minna niwa Naisho dakedo..." (Japanese: みんなにはナイショだけど...)	Mitsutoshi Satō	Hideo Takayashiki	July 3, 2005
1	"I Got a Love Letter!"; Transliteration: "Raburetā Morachatta!" (Japanese: ラブレターもらっちゃった!)	Mitsutoshi Satō	Hideo Takayashiki	July 3, 2005
Asami fantasizes about taking Kyosuke to bed while she prepares a special meal to celebrate his birthday, but everything goes wrong. The food winds up on the floor, her father and Kyosuke quarrel, and Kyosuke passes out after one too many beers. Asami finds a love letter in her shoe locker, then creates a disruption in Kyosuke's class by attempting to read it during his lecture. Kyosuke confiscates the letter, returning it after a quick glance. Asami avoids confronting her admirer, leaving school by a different exit.
2	"Welcome to the School Festival ♥"; Transliteration: "Gakuen Matsuri de Irasshaimase♥" (Japanese: 学園祭でいらっしゃいませ♥)	Takahiro Ikezoe	Hideo Takayashiki	July 10, 2005
2	"I Could Bear a Child...!"; Transliteration: "Kodomo ga Dekichaimashita...!" (Japanese: 子供ができちゃいました...!)	Takahiro Ikezoe	Hideo Takayashiki	July 10, 2005
Asami's class becomes a maid cafe for the school festival. The costumes are revealing, mortifying Asami, scandalizing Kyosuke, and outraging her father. Asami wants to adopt a stray kitten she finds in a park, naming it Kurii (繰井) after its intense eyes. Kyosuke would prefer a dog, so she brings food to the park instead, until a fierce rainstorm forces the issue.
3	"I Thought Today Would Be the Day..."; Transliteration: "Kyō koso wato Omotta noni..." (Japanese: 今日こそはと思ったのに...)	Shigetaka Ikeda	Hideo Takayashiki	July 17, 2005
3	"Participating in the Sakura Parent Meeting!"; Transliteration: "Sakura Oyako Sanjō" (Japanese: サクラ親子参上!)	Shigetaka Ikeda	Kazuyuki Fudeyasu	July 17, 2005
Asami alarms her friends by calling Kuri her new child. Kyosuke walks in on a fellow teacher and is disturbed by what he sees. Asami's romantic supper is interrupted when Kyosuke rushes off to counsel his distressed colleague. Nightclub worker Sakura Mizunosaki (水ノ咲サクラ, Mizunosaki Sakura) moves in next door. Desperate for a husband, the unwed mother starts putting the moves on the physics teacher. Powerless to resist, Asami collapses under the stress.
4	"My Husband Lied..."; Transliteration: "Danna-sama ga Uso o Tsuita..." (Japanese: ダンナ様がうそをついた...)	Hiromi Yokoyama	Hideo Takayashiki	July 24, 2005
4	"Can I Believe...?"; Transliteration: "Shinjite ii desuka..." (Japanese: 信じていいですか...)	Hiromi Yokoyama	Hideo Takayashiki	July 24, 2005
Kyosuke's colleague Iwasaki asks him to meet her for tea after school, but "tea" goes on for hours, eventually turning into dinner. When Kyosuke finally gets home, he lies that he had to work late, not realizing that while she was out shopping for him, Asami saw him with Iwasaki. Kyosuke goes out drinking with his colleagues, where Iwasaki confesses her love and tries to kiss him. Asami is overjoyed when Kyosuke returns home early and tries to kiss him on the veranda, but he feeds her a cherry instead.
5	"Our Secret Revealed...!"; Transliteration: "Barechaimashita...!" (Japanese: バレちゃいました...!)	Yukio Okazaki	Tatsuhiko Urahata	July 31, 2005
5	"You Want a Great-Grandchild...?!"; Transliteration: "Himago ga Hoshii...!?" (Japanese: ひ孫がほしい...!?)	Yasuyuki Fuse	Hideo Takayashiki	July 31, 2005
Sakura is tracking Kyosuke with her binoculars when Asami kisses him goodbye. Imagining them to be in some kind of incestuous relationship, she puts on her "battle dress" and confronts Asami after school. Kyosuke's grandmother arrives to "help the baby along," promising to stay and help Asami until she can see her great-grandchild. Kyosuke has kept Asami's age and status secret, so Asami has to sneak in and out of the house, changing clothes in the train station. Only when Asami's father visits does the truth come out.
6	"A Trip for Two People ♥"; Transliteration: "Futarikkiri no Ryokō" (Japanese: 二人っきりの旅行)	Hiromi Yokoyama	Kazuyuki Fudeyasu	August 7, 2005
6	"The Festival, Fireworks and..." Transliteration: "Matsuri to Hanabi to ..." (Japanese: 夏祭りと花火と...)	Masayuki Sakoi	Tatsuhiko Urahata	August 7, 2005
Kyosuke books a trip to an onsen by the sea so that he and Asami can spend some time alone together during the summer break, but the usual suspects keep getting in the way. Asami and Kyosuke go to the summer festival together, watch fireworks, and eat yakisoba.
7	"After the Summer Heat"; Transliteration: "Shokibarai no ato de" (Japanese: 暑気払いのあとで)	Yūki Kinoshita	Hideo Takayashiki	August 14, 2005
7	"My Teacher's Reward"; Transliteration: "Danna-sama no Gohōbi" (Japanese: ダンナさまのごほうび)	Yūki Kinoshita	Kazuyuki Fudeyasu	August 14, 2005
Asami and Kyosuke have a nabe party with the neighbors, but Kyosuke gets a stomach-ache and goes to the hospital. Asami must care for him there as a wife should without tipping off her friends. Asami is assigned to the 1000 meter run for sports day even though she is not very athletic. In order to inspire her, Kyosuke promises her a reward if she finishes in the top three.
8	"Me... In a Video...?"; Transliteration: "Atashi ga...Bideo ni...?" (Japanese: あたしが...ビデオに...?)	Yasuyuki Fuse	Tatsuhiko Urahata	August 21, 2005
8	"The Incident on a Rainy Day"; Transliteration: "Ame no Hi no Dekigoto" (Japanese: 雨の日の出来事)	Toshiharu Sato	Hideo Takayashiki	August 21, 2005
Instead of studying for mid-terms, Asami gets all hot and bothered after seeing some adult videos. Asami is saved from a violent man on the train by Iwasaki's younger brother, gets wet in the rain, and winds up on camera.
9	"Sleeping Together in the Infirmary!?"; Transliteration: "Hokenshitsu de Soine!?" (Japanese: 保健室で添い寝!?)	Toyoaki Nakajima	Kazuyuki Fudeyasu	August 28, 2005
9	"My Husband is the Lady of the House?"; Transliteration: "Danna-sama ga Oku-sama?" (Japanese: ダンナさまがおくさま?)	Shigetaka Ikeda	Kazuyuki Fudeyasu	August 28, 2005
First Kyosuke and then Asami are sent to the infirmary after being struck by a volleyball after school. Iwasaki insists on escorting Kyosuke home, and tells her brother to do the same for Asami. Only by ditching their escorts are Kyosuke and Asami able to make it home safely. Kyosuke takes over the household chores so that Asami can study, with predictable results.
10	"Tearful Stargazing"; Transliteration: "Namida no Tentaikansoku" (Japanese: 涙の天体観測)	Hiromi Yokoyama	Hideo Takayashiki	September 4, 2005
10	"I Won't Lose to a Little Girl"; Transliteration: "Komusume nanka ni Makenai wa" (Japanese: 小娘なんかに負けないわ)	Masayuki Sakoi	Kazuyuki Fudeyasu	September 4, 2005
Kyosuke volunteers for night duty at school so that he can watch the stars with Asami, but Iwasaki decides to surprise him with a homemade bento and discovers their inappropriate student-teacher contact. Iwasaki threatens to reveal Kyosuke unless he agrees to stop "seeing" Asami. The threat actually seems to bring husband and wife closer together, until Sakura's boy inserts himself.
11	"Would You Marry Me...?"; Transliteration: "Kekkon shite kuremasenka...?" (Japanese: 結婚してくれませんか...?)	Toyoaki Nakajima	Manabu Ishikawa	September 11, 2005
11	"Under the Stars of the Sky..."; Transliteration: "Manten no Hoshi no Shita de" (Japanese: 満天の星の下で...)	Toshiharu Sato	Kazuhiko Sōma	September 11, 2005
The manager of a convenience store suddenly proposes to Asami, with Kyosuke's inadvertent encouragement. His attention is soon diverted, however, by Sakura. An overnight field trip turns into a midnight tryst gone awry when Iwasaki decides to use the opportunity to press her suit.
12	"Our First Married Fight"; Transliteration: "Hajimete no Fūfu Genka" (Japanese: 初めての夫婦ゲンカ)	Yūki Kinoshita	Hideo Takayashiki	September 18, 2005
12	"Cold Warning!"; Transliteration: "Kaze ni Goyōjin!" (Japanese: 風邪にご用心!)	Yūki Kinoshita	Kazuyuki Fudeyasu	September 18, 2005
Spilled tea triggers a silly lover's quarrel. Asami runs out of the house, and eventually Kyosuke follows. Hours pass as the two search the town for each other, even while Asami's father parties with Sakura. He calls the school to apologize the next day, and Iwasaki's suspicions are aroused when she overhears Kyosuke talking to his father-in-law. Having run around in the cold for hours without a coat, Asami succumbs to a high fever the next day. When she collapses in the convenience store, the manager brings her to the hospital and calls the school, telling the teacher who answers that Kyosuke's "little sister" Asami is seriously ill. Iwasaki is not amused to learn that this previously unknown relative has the same name as her rival.
13	"The Marriage is Discovered!"; Transliteration: "Kekkon ga Bareta!" (Japanese: 結婚がばれた!)	Jun Shishido	Hideo Takayashiki	September 25, 2005
13	"I Will Always Love You..."; Transliteration: "Itsu made mo Zutto Aishite" (Japanese: いつまでもずっと愛して...)	Jun Shishido	Hideo Takayashiki	September 25, 2005
Iwasaki confronts Kyosuke with her suspicions in a family restaurant after school. Flustered, Kyosuke runs off without his briefcase, so Iwasaki delivers it to his house. Asami tries to hide, but is betrayed by a cockroach. Dinner winds up on the floor again. Kyosuke is called to the headmaster's office. Seeing Iwasaki standing at the headmaster's desk, and fearing that he has been discovered, Kyosuke presents the headmaster with the already prepared letter of resignation that he is carrying. Then a Christmas miracle occurs.

=== Video game ===
A video game based on the series was released for the PlayStation 2 on June 20, 2002, and later for the Dreamcast, as a "Director's Edition", on November 21 of that same year.

== See also ==
- Peridot, another manga series by the same author
- Hantsu × Trash, another manga series by the same author
