= Mysterious Girlfriend X =

Japanese manga series

- First tankōbon volume cover, featuring Mikoto Urabe

謎の彼女X (Nazo no Kanojo Ekkusu)
- Genre: Romantic comedy
- Manga
- Written by: Riichi Ueshiba
- Published by: Kodansha
- English publisher: NA: Vertical
- Imprint: Afternoon KC
- Magazine: Monthly Afternoon
- Original run: March 25, 2006 – September 25, 2014
- Volumes: 12
- Anime television series
- Directed by: Ayumu Watanabe
- Written by: Deko Akao
- Music by: Tomoki Hasegawa
- Studio: Hoods Entertainment
- Licensed by: AUS: Hanabe; UK: MVM Films
- Original network: Tokyo MX
- English network: Anime Network
- Original run: April 8, 2012 – July 1, 2012
- Episodes: 13
- Light novel

Nazo no Shōsetsuban
- Written by: Chihaya Sato
- Illustrated by: Riichi Ueshiba
- Published by: Kodansha
- Imprint: Kodansha Ranobe Bunko
- Published: June 1, 2012
- Volumes: 1
- Original video animation
- Directed by: Ayumu Watanabe
- Written by: Deko Akao
- Studio: Hoods Entertainment
- Licensed by: AUS: Hanabee; NA: Sentai Filmworks (Note: Home video rights through Section23 Films and streaming rights through HIDIVE.); UK: MVM Films
- Released: August 23, 2012
- Runtime: 26 minutes
- icon

Mysterious Girlfriend X (Japanese: 謎の彼女X, Hepburn: Nazo no Kanojo Ekkusu) is a Japanese manga series written and illustrated by Riichi Ueshiba. Originally published as a one-shot story in August 2004, it was serialized in Kodansha's seinen manga magazine Monthly Afternoon from March 2006 to September 2014. Its chapters were collected in 12 tankōbon volumes. The manga is licensed in North America by Vertical. The series follows a boy named Akira Tsubaki who knows next to nothing about girls, along with a new transfer student named Mikoto Urabe, a mysterious girl who wears a cold facade. Their first encounter takes a turn for the romantic.

An anime adaptation by Hoods Entertainment aired in Japan from April to July 2012, with an original video animation episode released in August 2012. The series is licensed by Sentai Filmworks in North America through Section23 Films for home video and streaming via HIDIVE.

== Plot ==
The series follows the relationship of Akira Tsubaki and Mikoto Urabe. Urabe is a transfer student who recently came to Tsubaki's school. After a series of strange events, Tsubaki finds himself addicted to Urabe's drool. Once she claims the addiction as love sickness, the relationship slowly progresses, focusing on the odd bond that comes out of the drool attachment.

As the story progresses, the relationship between the two deepens into genuine love. The manga strongly foreshadows that they will never break up, but rather will stay together for life.

== Characters ==
=== Main ===
Mikoto Urabe (卜部 美琴, Urabe Mikoto)
Voiced by: Ayako Yoshitani (Japanese); Genevieve Simmons (English)
Very little is known about Urabe, as Tsubaki's occasional visits to her apartments have never shown her parents to be around. She initially transfers to Tsubaki's school and gives off an unsocial air, refusing to eat lunch with her classmates in order to sleep. One day, she breaks out in hysterical laughter during class, falling to the ground. When later telling Tsubaki about it, she reveals to him that she heard a voice saying that he would be her very first intimate partner.
Urabe is very knowledgeable about the bond of drool that she and Tsubaki share. She displays her feeling through her drool, as her face is generally hidden behind her bangs. She has been shown to see Tsubaki's dreams through his drool, as well as use her own drool to cause him to have certain dreams. As the series progresses, she makes friends with Ayuko Oka, who also happens to share a drool bond with Urabe. Although she generally keeps quiet about her private life, she has been shown to be very sincere to her boyfriend, Tsubaki.
Among her many other quirks, Urabe is notable for her skill with scissors. The scissors, which she keeps tucked in her underwear, can be used to dextrously cut objects at high speed, like making a nearby hedge resemble Tsubaki. The scissors are used as threats, displays of anger, and as a defensive measure. This is but one of the factors that keeps Tsubaki from being more forward and aggressive with their relationship, although he seems to be generally fine with following Urabe's pace.
Akira Tsubaki (椿 明, Tsubaki Akira)
Voiced by: Miyu Irino (Japanese); Jessie James Grelle (English)
Tsubaki is an average boy by most standards. He lives with his sister and his father. His mother died when he was very young, prompting his sister to fulfill the motherly role instead. When Urabe transfers into his class, he is initially intrigued by her, particularly after one outburst of her hysterically laughing. After school one day, he wakes Urabe up from her desk, only to find a puddle of drool left behind. Absent-mindedly, he takes some on his finger and tastes it. Shortly afterwards, he falls ill. When Urabe visits him, she claims that he is suffering from "love-sickness", which he most likely got from tasting her drool. From there, the relationship begins, and Tsubaki quickly asks Urabe to be his girlfriend. Although she accepts, he continually feels that there is too much distance between them. Although they rarely have any physical contact, the two begin a ritual where Tsubaki tastes a bit of Urabe's drool each day. The drool can transmit feelings, among other things, between the two of them.
Tsubaki is not very aggressive in his pursuit of furthering his relationship with Urabe, slightly due to his fear of Urabe's scissors. He constantly compares his relationship to Kouhei's and Ayuko's, and will occasionally try to emulate them. He develops a taste for girls who look like Urabe, as evidenced by his collection of Urabe look-alike Japanese idol Momoka Imai's photos. Eventually she cuts them up with a double scissors attack.
Ayuko Oka (丘 歩子, Oka Ayuko)
Voiced by: Ryō Hirohashi (Japanese); Brittney Karbowski (English)
Ayuko is Kouhei's girlfriend and Urabe's eventual friend. She was first introduced when Tsubaki walked into his homeroom to see her and Kouhei kissing together. She is rather short (143cm tall), yet she has a body which resembles a model, which she seems to enjoy on occasion when she dresses her favorite clothes out of her boyfriend's permission. After she sees the drool-tasting ritual between Tsubaki and Urabe, she befriends Urabe, and it's revealed that they share a drool bond as well. Ayuko is portrayed as slightly lecherous, given by her positive reaction to peeking down Urabe's blouse. She views her relationship with Kouhei almost as a competition with Urabe and Tsubaki.
Kouhei Ueno (上野 公平, Ueno Kōhei)
Voiced by: Yūki Kaji (Japanese); Greg Ayres (English)
Kouhei is Tsubaki's friend and Ayuko's boyfriend. When Tsubaki first walked in on him and Ayuko kissing, Kouhei asked him to keep their relationship a secret, as he is rather shy about it. He helps Tsubaki by providing advice about relationships. Kouhei is shown to be very jealous of Ayuko, and does not like the idea of taking her to the beach. He also tries to keep some control by dressing her more conservative in order to avoid other boys from seeing her.
Youko Tsubaki (椿 陽子, Tsubaki Yōko)
Voiced by: Misato Fukuen (Japanese); Carli Mosier (English)
Tsubaki's elder sister. She considers it her duty to raise her brother properly in place of their deceased mother, and refuses to consider getting married until he graduates and finds a job. She spends her time housekeeping. Tsubaki's occasional strange behavior from the effects of Urabe's saliva sometimes makes Youko worry about her brother. Youko has met Urabe, but has not been told of the full extent of her relationship with Tsubaki. Urabe said she was only a classmate Tsubaki helps often at school, though some dialogue suggests she knows the truth. Urabe told her in chapter 85 of volume 11 in the bath house.

=== Supporting ===
Aika Hayakawa (早川 愛香, Hayakawa Aika)
Voiced by: Yū Shimamura (Japanese); Cynthia Martinez (English)
A beautiful, long-haired girl who was Tsubaki's classmate and first crush in middle school. She knew of his feelings for her, but never told him, and attended a different high school after graduation. Out of all of the cast she has a very possessive personality, faking a bruise to trick Tsubaki to pretend to be her boyfriend for a day and setting it up so Urabe will come to the festival during that time. However, after clearing up everything with her boyfriend they returned to being a couple again. Another note is that she and Tsubaki have similar quirks.
Momoka Imai (今井 百夏, Imai Momoka)
A media idol who looks almost identical to Urabe, except that she has brown hair and much smaller breasts. She makes an appearance in Chapter 37, and seems to have much more in common with Urabe than one would expect, though more energetic. Like how Urabe uses scissors on people, she kicks, though she wears restraints, however both are located where their panties are. She sought out Urabe in hopes she will agree to her plan of switching between model and student, however Urabe completely turns her down. After accidentally knocking her out (and Urabe cutting off all of her clothing), she discovers the difference in their breast sizes, seeming to have changed her mind after discovering this. After seeing Urabe and Tsubaki's bond, she goes with her promise and lets go of her plan to switch places, however not before stealing Urabe's uniform and going to make Tsubaki taste her drool. It is revealed she wanted to become a "normal" girl due to an incident with a boy she had a crush on before she became famous. Then after being discovered and becoming famous, she finally gained up the courage to confess her feelings to him, but before they kissed he asked if he could tell his friends he was dating a famous girl. Realizing he only liked her because she was famous, she high kicked him in the head.
Ryouko Suwano (諏訪野 亮子, Suwano Ryouko)
Voiced by: Ayumi Fujimura
Tsubaki and Urabe's beautiful classmate. She seems to have a crush on Tsubaki and frequently drops hints about that. Being responsible for collecting the class handouts along with Tsubaki, both of them have to stay back after school sometimes. This makes their other classmates think that they both like each other. According to Tsubaki, Suwano has "gentle soothing eyes". Suwano is one of the few people who know about Tsubaki and Urabe's "drool relationship". Suwano is good in swimming and has a flair for dramatics too. She later gets a boyfriend in a chapter called "Mysterious Shutter Chance".

=== Minor ===
Ogata (緒方, Ogata)
Voiced by: Takahiro Mizushima (Japanese); Chris Patton (English)
A popular, good-looking classmate of Tsubaki and Urabe who is also a star player of the school soccer team. He is interested in Urabe, and tries to ask her out, but she turns him down because, unlike Tsubaki, his body has no reaction to her drool.
Minori Matsuzawa (松沢 稔, Matsuzawa Minori)
An attractive, short-haired schoolmate of Tsubaki who is one grade below him. She and Tsubaki met through the school film club. She likes Tsubaki because they share unusual tastes in movies. Although Tsubaki in turn enjoys talking to her, he worries that the attention she gives him will make Urabe jealous. Later she is announced to be the film club vice president in the chapter Mysterious Film Club Production.
Yoshikawa (芳川, Yoshikawa)
The idol of class 2-C. A beautiful and talented athlete with large breasts and an outwardly nice personality, but vain. She has a rivalry with Suwano Ryouko, her former middle school classmate. Suwano says she is the type of person who likes to watch others embarrass themselves while also liking to be the center of attention herself.

== Media ==
=== Manga ===
Mysterious Girlfriend X is written and illustrated by Riichi Ueshiba. A one-shot chapter was first published in Kodansha's seinen manga magazine Monthly Afternoon in August 2004. It was then serialized in the same magazine from March 25, 2006, to September 25, 2014. Kodansha collected its chapters in twelve tankōbon volumes, released from August 23, 2006, to November 21, 2014.

The manga is available in English as part of a read-only/download-only subscription from Azuki and Kodansha. Vertical licensed the series for release in North America, publishing the series in six omnibus volumes from March 15, 2016, to June 13, 2017.

==== Volumes ====
No.	Original release date	Original ISBN	English release date	English ISBN
1	August 23, 2006	978-4-06-314424-6	March 15, 2016 (print); November 8, 2016 (digital)	978-1-94299-345-2 (print); 978-1-68233-498-0 (digital)
0. "Mysterious Girlfriend X" (謎の彼女X, Nazo no Kanojo Ekkusu); 0.5 "Mysterious Haircut" (謎のヘアカット, Nazo no Heakatto); 1. "Mysterious Bond" (謎の絆, Nazo no Kizuna); 2. "Mysterious Picture" (謎の写真, Nazo no Shashin); 3. "Mysterious Test Tube" (謎の試験管, Nazo no Shikenkan); 4. "Mysterious Windy Day" (謎の、風が強い日, Nazo no, Kaze ga Tsuyoi Hi)
2	June 22, 2007	978-4-06-314457-4	March 15, 2016 (print); November 8, 2016 (digital)	978-1-94299-345-2 (print); 978-1-68233-498-0 (digital)
5. "Mysterious Pool Opening Day" (謎のプール開き, Nazo no Pūru-biraki); 6. "Mysterious Summer Break" (謎の夏休み, Nazo no Natsuyasumi); 7. "Mysterious Girl Meets Girl" (謎のガール・ミーツ・ガール, Nazo no Gāru Mītsu Gāru); 8. "Mysterious Girl Meets Mysterious Girl, Continued" (続・謎のガール・ミーツ・ガール, Zoku Nazo no Gāru Mītsu Gāru); 9. "Mysterious Sign" (謎の合図(サイン), Nazo no Sain); 10. "Mysterious Miracle Drug" (謎の特効薬, Nazo no Tokkōyaku); 11. "Mysterious Arousal" (謎の興奮, Nazo no Kōfun); 12. "Mysterious Memory" (謎の記憶, Nazo no Kioku); 12.5 "Mysterious Meow" (謎の「にゃーん♪」, Nazo no 'Nyan♪')
3	February 22, 2008	978-4-06-314490-1	June 21, 2016 (print); November 8, 2016 (digital)	978-1-94299-346-9 (print); 978-1-68233-499-7 (digital)
13. "Mysterious Dessert" (謎のデザート, Nazo no Dezāto); 14. "Mysterious Rain Shelter" (謎の雨宿り, Nazo no Amayadori); 15. "Mysterious Step Up" (謎のステップ・アップ, Nazo no Suteppu Appu); 16. "Mysterious Dip in the Sea" (謎の海水浴, Nazo no Kaisuiyoku); 17. "Mysterious Sports Festival" (謎の体育祭, Nazo no Taīkusai); 18. "Mysterious Studying for Exams" (謎の試験勉強, Nazo no Shiken Benkyō); 19. "Mysterious Older Sister" (謎のお姉さん, Nazo no Onē-san); 20. "Mysterious Feeling" (謎の感触, Nazo no Kanshoku); Bonus: "Mysterious Boyfriend X" (謎の彼氏X, Nazo no Kareshi Ekkusu)
4	November 21, 2008	978-4-06-314539-7	June 21, 2016 (print); November 8, 2016 (digital)	978-1-94299-346-9 (print); 978-1-68233-499-7 (digital)
21. "Mysterious Sensation" (謎の感覚, Nazo no Kankaku); 22. "Mysterious Response" (謎の感応, Nazo no Kanō); 23. "Mysterious 'It's Kinda… I Dunno…'" (謎の「なんだかちょっと」, Nazo no 'Nandaka Chotto'); 24. "Mysterious Idol" (謎の偶像, Nazo no Gūzō); 25. "Mysterious Moment" (謎の一瞬, Nazo no Isshun); 26. "Mysterious Souvenir" (謎のお土産, Nazo no Omiyage); 27. "Mysterious Midsummer Greeting" (謎の暑中見舞い, Nazo no Shochū Mimai); 28. "Mysterious Affair" (謎のアバンチュール, Nazo no Abanchūru); Bonus: "Special Technique Report" (必殺技報告書(レポート), Hissatsu Waza Repōto)
5	August 21, 2009	978-4-06-314583-0	September 20, 2016 (print); November 8, 2016 (digital)	978-1-94299-370-4 (print); 978-1-68233-500-0 (digital)
29. "Mysterious Letter of Challenge" (謎の挑戦状, Nazo no Chōsen-jō); 30. "Mysterious Cultural Festival — The Night Before" (謎の文化祭・前夜, Nazo no Bunkasai Zenya); 31. "Mysterious Cultural Festival (Part 1)" (謎の文化祭 (前編), Nazo no Bunkasai (Zenpen)); 32. "Mysterious Cultural Festival (Part 2)" (謎の文化祭 (中編), Nazo no Bunkasai (Chūhen)); 33. "Mysterious Cultural Festival (Part 3)" (謎の文化祭 (後編), Nazo no Bunkasai (Kōhen)); 34. "Mysterious Cultural Festival — The Afterparty" (謎の文化祭 (打ち上げ), Nazo no Bunkasai (Uchiage)); 35. "Mysterious Delusion (Part 1)" (謎の妄想 (前編), Nazo no Mōsō (Zenpen)); 36. "Mysterious Delusion (Part 2)" (謎の妄想 (後編), Nazo no Mōsō (Kōhen)); 36.5 "Mysterious 'Dirty Old Man Transformation' Phenomenon" (謎の「おっさん化」現象, Nazo no 'Ossan-ka' Genshō)
6	June 23, 2010	978-4-06-310673-2	September 20, 2016 (print); November 8, 2016 (digital)	978-1-94299-370-4 (print); 978-1-68233-500-0 (digital)
37. "Mysterious High Kick" (謎のハイキック, Nazo no Haikikku); 38. "Mysterious Plan" (謎の計画, Nazo no Keikaku); 39. "Mysterious Unison" (謎の同調(ユニゾン), Nazo no Yunizon); 40. "Mysterious Writing" (謎の文字, Nazo no Moji); 41. "Mysterious Performance" (謎のパフォーマンス, Nazo no Pafōmansu); 42. "Mysterious Experiment" (謎の実験, Nazo no Jikken); 43. "Mysterious Experiment Results" (謎の実験結果, Nazo no Jikken Kekka); 44. "Mysterious Tremble" (謎の震え, Nazo no Furue)
7	February 23, 2011	978-4-06-310729-6	December 27, 2016	978-1-94299-371-1 (print); 978-1-68233-520-8 (digital)
45. "Mysterious Choice" (謎の選択, Nazo no Sentaku); 46. "Mysterious Switch" (謎のスイッチ, Nazo no Suitchi); 47. "Mysterious Concert" (謎のライブ, Nazo no Raibu); 48. "Mysterious Duo" (謎のふたり, Nazo no Futari); Extra Story: "Idol Arc Epilogue: Mysterious Idol M" (アイドル編エピローグ 謎のアイドルM, Aidoru-hen Epirōgu: Nazo no Aidoru M); 49. "Mysterious Carnivore Girl (Part 1)" (謎の肉食女子 (前編), Nazo no Nikushoku Joshi (Zenpen)); 50. "Mysterious Carnivore Girl (Part 2)" (謎の肉食女子 (後編), Nazo no Nikushoku Joshi (Kōhen)); 51. "Mysterious 'Slanted Eyes vs. Droopy Eyes' (Part 1)" (謎の「吊り目vs.垂れ目」 (前編), Nazo no 'Tsuri-me vs. Tare-me' (Zenpen)); 52. "Mysterious 'Slanted Eyes vs. Droopy Eyes' (Part 2)" (謎の「吊り目vs.垂れ目」 (後編), Nazo no 'Tsuri-me vs. Tare-me' (Kōhen))
8	February 23, 2012	978-4-06-387806-6 (RE); 978-4-06-358385-4 (CE)	December 27, 2016	978-1-94299-371-1 (print); 978-1-68233-520-8 (digital)
53. "Mysterious Cold" (謎の風邪, Nazo no Kaze); 54. "Mysterious Man's Dream" (謎の「男のロマン」, Nazo no 'Otoko no Roman'); 55. "Mysterious Petal" (謎のひとひら, Nazo no Hitohira); 56. "Mysterious Throb" (謎の疼き, Nazo no Uzuki); 57. "Mysterious Summer Uniform" (謎の夏服, Nazo no Natsufuku); 58. "Mysterious Swim Meet (Part 1)" (謎の水泳大会 (前編), Nazo no Suiei Taikai (Zenpen)); 59. "Mysterious Swim Meet (Part 2)" (謎の水泳大会 (後編), Nazo no Suiei Taikai (Kōhen)); 60. "Mysterious August 31" (謎の8月31日, Nazo no Hachigatsu Sanjūichi-nichi)
9	August 23, 2012	978-4-06-387835-6 (RE); 978-4-06-358391-5 (DE)	March 14, 2017	978-1-94299-372-8 (print); 978-1-68233-560-4 (digital)
61. "Mysterious Body Double" (謎の身代わり, Nazo no Migawari); 62. "Mysterious Movie Production (1)" (謎の映画制作 (一), Nazo no Eiga Seisaku (Ichi)); 63. "Mysterious Movie Production (2)" (謎の映画制作 (二), Nazo no Eiga Seisaku (Ni)); 64. "Mysterious Movie Production (3)" (謎の映画制作 (三), Nazo no Eiga Seisaku (San)); 65. "Mysterious Movie Production (4)" (謎の映画制作 (四), Nazo no Eiga Seisaku (Yon)); 66. "Mysterious Movie Production (5)" (謎の映画制作 (五), Nazo no Eiga Seisaku (Go)); 67. "Mysterious Movie Production (6)" (謎の映画制作 (六), Nazo no Eiga Seisaku (Roku)); 68. "Mysterious Movie Production (7)" (謎の映画制作 (七), Nazo no Eiga Seisaku (Nana))
10	May 23, 2013	978-4-06-387885-1	March 14, 2017	978-1-94299-372-8 (print); 978-1-68233-560-4 (digital)
69. "Mysterious Movie Screening (1)" (謎の上映会 (前編), Nazo no Jōei-kai (Zenpen)); 70. "Mysterious Movie Screening (2)" (謎の上映会 (後編), Nazo no Jōei-kai (Kōhen)); 71. "Mysterious Mole" (謎の黒子, Nazo no Hokuro); 72. "Mysterious Fruit" (謎のフルーツ, Nazo no Furūtsu); 73. "Mysterious Christmas" (謎のクリスマス, Nazo no Kurisumasu); 74. "Mysterious New Year's Card" (謎の年賀状, Nazo no Nengajō); 75. "Mysterious Valentine" (謎のバレンタイン, Nazo no Barentain); 76. "Mysterious White Day" (謎のホワイト・デー, Nazo no Howaitodē)
11	February 21, 2014	978-4-06-387957-5	June 13, 2017	978-1-94299-373-5 (print); 978-1-68233-712-7 (digital)
77. "Mysterious Softball" (謎のソフトボール, Nazo no Sofutobōru); 78. "Mysterious Dress" (謎のワンピース, Nazo no Wanpīsu); 79. "Mysterious Poolside" (謎のプールサイド, Nazo no Pūrusaido); 80. "Mysterious Fireworks" (謎の花火, Nazo no Hanabi); 81. "Mysterious Backstory" (謎の経緯, Nazo no Ikisatsu); 82. "Mysterious Tennis Court" (謎のテニスコート, Nazo no Tenisukōto); 83. "Mysterious Photo Op" (謎のシャッター・チャンス, Nazo no Shattā Chansu); 84. "Mysterious 'Tsubaki vs. Urabe'" (謎の「椿vs.卜部」, Nazo no 'Tsubaki vs. Urabe')
12	November 21, 2014	978-4-06-388010-6	June 13, 2017	978-1-94299-373-5 (print); 978-1-68233-712-7 (digital)
85. "Mysterious Snow" (謎の雪, Nazo no Yuki); 86. "Mysterious Photo Op II" (謎のシャッター・チャンス2, Nazo no Shattā Chansu 2); 87. "Mysterious Cologne" (謎の香水, Nazo no Kōsui); 88. "Mysterious 'Rut'" (謎の「倦怠期」, Nazo no 'Kentaiki'); 89. "Mysterious Curry Rice" (謎のカレーライス, Nazo no Karēraisu); 90. "Mysterious Shopping" (謎のショッピング, Nazo no Shoppingu); 91. "Mysterious Sunset (Part 1)" (謎の夕焼け (前編), Nazo no Yūyake (Zenpen)); 92. "Mysterious Sunset (Part 2)" (謎の夕焼け (後編), Nazo no Yūyake (Kōhen)); Bonus: "Mysterious Girlfriend X: Robot" (謎の彼女Xロボ, Nazo no Kanojo Ekkusu Robo)

=== Anime ===
An anime adaptation was announced in the February 2012 issue of Monthly Afternoon, released on December 24, 2011. Produced by Hoods Entertainment, it was directed by Ayumu Watanabe, with scripts supervised by Hitomi Mieno, and character designs by Kenichi Konishi. Shizue Kaneko worked as chief animation director with art director Shigemi Ikeda. Masafumi Mima worked as sound director. The series was first broadcast on Tokyo MX from April 8 to July 1, 2012. (Note: Mysterious Girlfriend X first aired on Tokyo MX on Saturday 25:30, effectively Sunday at 1:30 a.m. JST.) It was simulcast in other countries by Crunchyroll. The opening theme is "Orchestra of Love" (恋のオーケストラ, Koi no Ōkesutora) by Ayako Yoshitani, the voice actress for Mikoto Urabe. The ending theme is "Afterschool Promise" (放課後の約束, Hōkago no Yakusoku), also by Yoshitani. An original video animation episode was released with the ninth volume of the manga on August 23, 2012.

The series has been licensed in North America by Sentai Filmworks and began streaming on The Anime Network and Hulu 31 days following its airdate. Sentai Filmworks released a box-set containing the entire 13 episode TV series on Blu-ray and DVD June 11, 2013. After the acquisition of Crunchyroll by Sony Pictures Television, Mysterious Girlfriend X, among several Sentai Filmworks titles, was dropped from the Crunchyroll streaming service on March 31, 2022. An English dub was released in Australia by Hanabee Entertainment on June 5, 2013.

==== Episodes ====
No.	Title	Original release date
1	"Mysterious Girlfriend"; Transliteration: "Nazo no Kanojo" (Japanese: 謎の彼女)	April 8, 2012
A strange new transfer student named Mikoto Urabe is instantly labelled as a weirdo due to her odd sleeping patterns and a strange outburst of laughter during class. When Akira Tsubaki wakes up Urabe at the end of a school day, he finds her face enchanting and ends up sampling some of her drool. After having a dream about Urabe that he can not seem to get out of his head, Tsubaki suddenly comes down with fever. Urabe goes to Tsubaki's house and gives him more of her drool which cures his fever, explaining his symptoms were the result of withdrawal from not getting any more drool. As such, Urabe begins meeting up with Tsubaki every day to give him some more of her drool. As Tsubaki starts to fall in love with Urabe, he decides to confess to her after a few days. When asked by Urabe to profess his love in a way only he can, Tsubaki demonstrates it by ripping up a photo he had in his wallet of his middle school crush. After explaining the reason she laughed in class was because a voice told her Tsubaki would be the first person she would have sex with, Urabe agrees to become his girlfriend.
2	"Mysterious Bond"; Transliteration: "Nazo no Kizuna" (Japanese: 謎の絆)	April 15, 2012
Tsubaki decides to ask his friend, Kouhei Ueno, what he could do to advance his relationship with Urabe, though none of his advice seem to work on Urabe. When asked if they really are in a relationship or not, Urabe takes Tsubaki to an abandoned house. She tells Tsubaki to close his eyes and then she undresses, and then feeds Tsubaki her drool, explaining that their drool is a special bond that allows them to know what they are feeling. The next day, after Tsubaki has a strange dream involving Urabe, Urabe drinks some of Tsubaki's drool and somehow manages to recall his dream in great detail.
3	"Mysterious Test Tube"; Transliteration: "Nazo no Shikenkan" (Japanese: 謎の試験管)	April 22, 2012
Tsubaki spots Kouhei kissing Ayuko Oka, who Kouhei explains is his girlfriend, whom he's been secretly dating for a while. When Tsubaki expresses his desire to kiss Urabe, she gives him a testtube of her drool, telling him to drink it before he goes to bed. That night he has a dream where he is accidentally kissed by Urabe, feeling disappointed that she is not putting her feelings into it. The next day, Tsubaki comes to realise they should only kiss when they come to understand each other's feelings. Later at school, another boy in Tsubaki's class, Ogata, confesses to Urabe, asking her to go out with him. Urabe decides to give him a reply the next day, forbidding Tsubaki to interfere. The next day, she feeds Ogata some of her drool and, upon hearing he does not feel any different, rejects him. After doing the same with Tsubaki, which makes his nose bleed, because she was not wearing underwear that day, Urabe explains how his reaction to her drool is proof that he is the only one she shares this bond with, and they walk home together holding hands.
4	"Mysterious Girl meets Girl"; Transliteration: "Nazo no Gāru Mītsu Gāru" (Japanese: 謎のガール・ミーツ・ガール)	April 29, 2012
Ayuko decides to have her lunch next to Urabe, much to everyone's surprise. As Urabe gets a scrape during PE the next day, Ayuko takes her to the nurse's office to treat it. After sharing a drink with her, Ayuko discovers she suddenly has the same injury as Urabe. They soon deduce that Urabe's drool can also transfer injuries, showing Ayuko has a similar connection to her as Tsubaki does. Ayuko mentions how she became fascinated by Urabe after seeing her with Tsubaki, but Mikoto rejects her offer of becoming friends. The next day, Ayuko feeds some of her drool to Urabe, deducing from her reaction to its sweet taste that she has not kissed Tsubaki yet. Afterwards, Urabe and Ayuko begin a daily routine of having lunch together.
5	"Mysterious First Date"; Transliteration: "Nazo no Fāsuto Dēto" (Japanese: 謎のファーストデート)	May 6, 2012
After failing to see Urabe in a swimsuit during swim class, Tsubaki sees an image of her in a swimsuit while tasting her sweat. As summer vacation arrives and the two continue their drool swapping tradition, Tsubaki manages to build up the courage to ask Urabe on a date to the beach. A week passes and Tsubaki and a tanned Urabe head to the beach where they eat yakisoba and swim in the ocean. Upon spotting a tanline from Mikoto's pair of scissors, Tsubaki gets a nosebleed which Urabe later experiences when she tries Tsubaki's drool on the way home.
6	"Mysterious Step Up"; Transliteration: "Nazo no Suteppu Appu" (Japanese: 謎のステップ・アップ)	May 13, 2012
While shopping for clothes, Tsubaki is met by Ayuko who talks to him about using first names with her boyfriend, Kouhei. Ayuko deduces that Urabe and Tsubaki do not use each others' first names via an abridged drool swapping with Tsubaki. She then accosts Urabe similarly and talks to her about first names briefly before Urabe excuses herself. At the park Tsubaki preys upon a sleeping Urabe by whispering her first name "Mikoto" to her. Tsubaki has another weird dream again and blurts out that he wants a photo of Urabe when they are walking to school. Later, Tsubaki is waiting for Urabe at a bridge and his old crush, Aika Hayakawa, invites him to a coffee date. After he declines the invitation, Tsubaki finds Urabe hiding at one of the bridge ends and says she did not want to interrupt the conversation. While walking back, Urabe and Tsubaki talk about Tsubakis's crush. After a drool swap, the two understand each others feelings before Tsubaki whips out the camera again to try and take a photo of Urabe who lets him take a picture with her tongue sticking out.
7	"Mysterious Flu"; Transliteration: "Nazo no Hayarikaze" (Japanese: 謎の流行風邪)	May 20, 2012
After showing impressive display on the track, Urabe is asked to participate in a relay race for the sports festival, although she rejects the idea of joining the track team as it means she would not be able to walk home with Tsubaki. As the students switch to their winter uniforms, Tsubaki comes down with a cold. Having heard from Ayuko about how she dressed up in a bikini to help Kouhei get over a cold, Urabe secretly wears a bikini under her coat and gives Tsubaki some of her drool, which helps him recover. On the day of the sports festival, Urabe manages to help bring her team to victory in the relay race. Tsubaki suggests to Urabe that she should join the track team, but Urabe once again rejects, as she much prefers spending time with Akira.
8	"Mysterious Sensation"; Transliteration: "Nazo no Kankaku" (Japanese: 謎の感覚)	May 27, 2012
Tsubaki has a dream where he got to squeeze Urabe's breast and can not get the sensation out of his head. Taking a stroll, he decides to go in the direction Urabe usually takes after school and comes up to an apartment block, which turns out to be where Urabe lives. Urabe invites Tsubaki into her apartment for a drink, where his imagination starts to get the better of him. After catching Mikoto as she trips after being spooked by some lightning, Tsubaki almost reaches for her breast but Urabe stops him. After getting Tsubaki to tell her about his dream, she feeds him some drool whilst grabbing her own breast, giving him a stronger sense of the feeling. She then allows Tsubaki the opportunity to touch them for himself, which causes Tsubaki to become more aggressive and tease her ears until he notices Urabe is crying and leaves. The next day, after Urabe gets some advice from Ayuko about the new experiences she is feeling, Tsubaki asks Urabe to slap him as a way of apology. Afterwards, Urabe explains the feeling she gets when her ear is touched before taking on Tsubaki's bruise herself.
9	"Mysterious 'This is just, I dunno...'" Transliteration: "Nazo no 'Nandaka Chotto'" (Japanese: 謎の「なんだかちょっと」)	June 3, 2012
Noticing Urabe with a serious case of bedhead, Ayuko fixes her up with a new hairstyle. Urabe soon gets a lot of attention for her new hairstyle, which makes Tsubaki a bit jealous. As they go home, Tsubaki convinces Urabe to go back to her old hairstyle and messes up her hair on her request. The next day, as Ayuko calls her out on it, Urabe shows her the feeling of having her hair messed up, which she comes to enjoy. Meanwhile, as Tsubaki gets frustrated when one of the male students starts selling photos of Urabe's alternate hairstyle, he learns of an idol named Momoko Imai who has a strong likeness to Urabe. Tsubaki soon impulsively buys Momoko's photobook and enjoys looking at it. As Urabe hears about it from Ayuko, who heard about it from Kouhei, she demands Tsubaki to bring the book to her and destroys it with her scissors, saying that he does not need to worship an idol that looks like her.
10	"Mysterious Adventure"; Transliteration: "Nazo no Abanchūru" (Japanese: 謎のアバンチュール)	June 10, 2012
Tsubaki runs into Aika who, having just been dumped by her boyfriend, reveals how she knew of Akira's feelings for her when he lies about not having a girlfriend. Aika gives Tsubaki the opportunity to try some of her drool, but he backs out realising it could damage his bond with Urabe, bringing to light that he does have a girlfriend. The next day, Aika decides to approach Urabe, inviting her to her school's culture festival on Sunday with the news that Tsubaki might be there. Later that night, Aika calls out Tsubaki with a fake wound on her face, manipulating Tsubaki into coming to the festival with her and pretending to be her boyfriend. Tsubaki tries to come up with an alibi in front of Urabe, but she soon learns the truth from Ayuko. As Tsubaki goes to the festival on Sunday, Aika shows up wearing her old middle school uniform.
11	"Mysterious Cultural Festival"; Transliteration: "Nazo no Bunkasai" (Japanese: 謎の文化祭)	June 17, 2012
As Ayuko goes to the festival with Kouhei, she spots Tsubaki with Aika and decides to follow them. As Tsubaki tries to hold off the advances of Aika, Urabe appears in a box robot, suggesting they do a blind taste test of each of their drool to see which Tsubaki prefers. Akira instantly gets a nosebleed from Urabe's drool, due to the fact that she was naked inside her costume. Aika gets naked and attempts to give Tsubaki her drool, but she stops when she starts crying, making it clear that her advances on Tsubaki were simply an attempt to get over losing her boyfriend, who had feelings for someone else even when he was dating her. Urabe tries some of Aika's drool, sensing she has long had unrequited love but assuring her she'll one day find the right someone. Just then, Tsubaki's blindfold gets shaken off and he sees the girls naked, prompting slaps from the both of them. As Tsubaki and Urabe leave together, she tells him that her eventual kiss with him will be her first, prompting a smile when she tries his drool.
12	"Mysterious 'Squeeze'"; Transliteration: "Nazo no 'Gyu'" (Japanese: 謎の「ぎゅっ」)	June 24, 2012
As Tsubaki is a little bashful around Urabe after having seen her naked, she requests to try his drool to experience how flustered he is. The next day, when Urabe uses her scissors against Tsubaki for attempting to hug her, she is shocked when she sees she had cut his forehead a little. As Urabe takes Tsubaki to her home to get his injury treated, she finds her scissors have become less accurate, which she believes to be caused by a strange dream she had after trying Tsubaki's drool. As Urabe gives Tsubaki more of her drool, he starts picturing Urabe naked and ends up banging his head whilst trying to avoid hugging Urabe on impulse. After hearing his reasoning, Urabe decides to hug Tsubaki of her own accord, which in turn restores her scissor technique. The next day, as Ryouko Suwano (諏訪野 亮子, Suwano Ryōko), one of his classmates, offers to replace Tsubaki's gauze, Tsubaki opts to keep it as it was the gauze Urabe gave him. Later that day, Urabe once again initiates a hug.
13	"Mysterious Girlfriend and Boyfriend"; Transliteration: "Nazo no Kanojo to Kareshi" (Japanese: 謎の彼女と彼氏)	July 1, 2012
While out shopping, Urabe meets up with Tsubaki's sister, Youko, who takes her to a coffee shop, where she talks about past love crushes and asks about having a boyfriend. She mentions that she promised her deceased mother that she will take care of Tsubaki until he finishes his studies, and so does not have time for romances. Later on, Urabe asks Tsubaki to go to his mother's grave next Sunday and pay their respects. Urabe meets with Tsubaki and he's surprised to see her very formally dressed. After paying their respects and talking about Tsubaki's mother, Urabe wants to "feel" Tsubaki's memories about his mother and they decide to simultaneously exchange drool while Urabe touches the gravestone. Urabe and Tsubaki both end up shedding tears and they feel that their bond has deepened as they continue to walk off talking and laughing.

==== OVA ====
No.	Title	Original release date
1	"Mysterious Summer Festival"; Transliteration: "Nazo no Natsu Matsuri" (Japanese: 謎の夏祭り)	August 23, 2012
Tsubaki, Urabe, Kouhei and Ayuko go together to the summer festival. As Kouhei and Ayuko go off together, Tsubaki and Urabe are left on their own, but get separated in the crowd, with Urabe being led away by a mysterious masked girl. As Tsubaki searches for her, he comes across a strange tent where Urabe is found tied up. Tsubaki is then challenged by her kidnappers to pull a rope to free her, pulling the wrong one causing her to fall. Believing in their bond, Urabe drools down the rope she is tied up against, allowing Tsubaki to deduce the correct rope to pull. After Tsubaki frees Urabe, the kidnappers and the tent mysteriously disappear and Tsubaki and Urabe find themselves at the shrine, where Urabe gives Tsubaki a red string bracelet.

=== Light novel ===
A light novel spin-off was published by Kodansha on June 1, 2012. Titled Nazo no Kanojo X: Nazo no Shōsetsuban (謎の彼女X 謎の小説版; 'Mysterious Girlfriend X: Mysterious Novel Edition'), it was written by Chihaya Sato with new illustrations by Ueshiba.
