= Hantsu × Trash =

Japanese manga series

- First tankōbon volume cover, featuring Chisato Hagiwara (front), with Yōhei Hamaji and Nakajima (background)

ハンツー×トラッシュ (Hantsū × Torasshu)
- Genre: Sex comedy; Sports
- Manga
- Written by: Hiyoko Kobayashi
- Published by: Kodansha
- Magazine: Weekly Young Magazine
- Original run: July 23, 2012 – January 6, 2020
- Volumes: 18
- Original animation DVD
- Directed by: Hisashi Saito
- Written by: Keiichirō Ōchi
- Studio: Hoods Entertainment
- Released: October 6, 2015 – November 4, 2016
- Runtime: 12 minutes
- Episodes: 3
- icon

Hantsu × Trash (Japanese: ハンツー×トラッシュ, Hepburn: Hantsū × Torasshu) is a Japanese manga series written and illustrated by Hiyoko Kobayashi. It was serialized in Kodansha's Weekly Young Magazine from July 2012 to January 2020, with its chapters collected in 18 tankōbon volumes.

A three-episode original animation DVD (OAD) adaptation was produced by Hoods Entertainment and released from October 2015 to November 2016.

By March 2020, the manga had over 1.5 million copies in circulation.

== Premise ==
Yōhei Hamaji is a high school student who is considered trash for being unpopular with the girls. He is recruited by Nakajima, a perverted upperclassman, to join the school's water polo team, under the premise that they get to do co-ed practice with the girls team and can touch them all they want during those sessions. Hamaji is berated by the girls' star player Chisato Hagiwara, but develops a crush on her because she is one of the girls who actually cares about him. He then tries to take water polo seriously to try to win her heart.

== Characters ==
Yōhei Hamaji (浜路 洋平, Hamaji Yōhei)
Voiced by: Yuma Uchida
A first-year high school boy who is recruited into the water polo team. He initially does so just to get the girls but falls in love with Chisato, and tries to better himself.
Chisato Hagiwara (萩原 千里, Hagiwara Chisato)
Voiced by: Maaya Uchida
A second-year student and star of the girls water polo team. She takes the sport seriously, but cannot stand the pervertedness of the boys team. Her manga profile describes her as a bit clumsy personality and inexperienced when it comes to relationships.
Nakajima (中島)
Voiced by: Kenta Matsumoto
A second-year student and member of the water polo team. He is usually seen wearing sunglasses and is always unashamedly perverted, ogling the girls and talking about having had sex with them in his fantasies many times over.
Mano (真野)
A handsome second-year student who was a former water polo star in middle school. He is not interested in being on the high school team but is interested in Chisato.
Mai Shinozaki (篠崎 舞, Shinozaki Mai)
Voiced by: Yurika Kubo
Chisato's teammate. She has a crush on Chisato and joined the water polo team because of it.
Manami Miyoshi (美好 まなみ, Miyoshi Manami)
Voiced by: Shizuka Itō
A former star player of the high school's water polo team, Miyoshi is a university student who volunteers with the school as an assistant coach. She is especially attracted to virgins, hoping to take their first times, but at the school she mainly directs her efforts at the oblivious Hamaji.
Amamiya (雨宮)
Chisato's water polo teammate with short dark hair and known for her "rocket breasts". She attracts the affection of Shioda, one of the water polo boys, but finds him somewhat annoying.
Maki Hayami (速水 真紀, Hayami Maki)
Voiced by: Saki Yamakita
A pretty and shy first-year student who was part of the track team but did not want to run anymore because she was self-conscious of her large chest. She joins the water polo team because of Hamaji, and falls in love with him. She tries to be his girlfriend, but becomes discouraged when she finds he has feelings for Chisato.

== Media ==
=== Manga ===
Written and illustrated by Hiyoko Kobayashi, Hantsu × Trash was serialized in Kodansha's Weekly Young Magazine from July 23, 2012, to January 6, 2020. Kodansha collected its chapters in 18 tankōbon volumes, released from January 4, 2013, to March 6, 2020.

==== Volumes ====
No.	Release date	ISBN
1	January 4, 2013	978-4-06-382248-9
2	April 5, 2013	978-4-06-382278-6
3	August 6, 2013	978-4-06-382341-7
4	December 6, 2013	978-4-06-382389-9
5	May 2, 2014	978-4-06-382453-7
6	September 5, 2014	978-4-06-382514-5
7	March 6, 2015	978-4-06-382560-2; 978-4-06-358758-6 (SE)
8	October 6, 2015	978-4-06-382665-4; 978-4-06-362314-7 (SE)
9	February 5, 2016	978-4-06-382730-9
10	June 6, 2016	978-4-06-382797-2; 978-4-06-362333-8 (SE)
11	November 4, 2016	978-4-06-382877-1; 978-4-06-362342-0 (SE)
12	May 2, 2017	978-4-06-382945-7; 978-4-06-397033-3 (SE)
13	October 6, 2017	978-4-06-510254-1
14	March 6, 2018	978-4-06-511077-5
15	August 6, 2018	978-4-06-512409-3; 978-4-06-512410-9 (SE)
16	February 6, 2019	978-4-06-514157-1; 978-4-06-515005-4 (SE)
17	June 6, 2019	978-4-06-516127-2; 978-4-06-516130-2 (SE)
18	March 6, 2020	978-4-06-518815-6; 978-4-06-518814-9 (SE)

=== Original Animation DVD ===
An original video DVD (OAD) produced by Hoods Entertainment was bundled with the eighth volume of the manga on October 6, 2015. A second OAD was bundled with the 10th volume of the manga on June 6, 2016. A third OAD was bundled with the 11th volume of the manga on November 4, 2016. The opening theme is "Hachamecha × Strike" (ハチャメチャ×ストライク, Hachamecha × Sutoraiku), performed by i☆Ris.

== Reception ==
By March 2020, Hantsu × Trash had over 1.5 million copies in circulation.

== See also ==
- Peridot, another manga series by the same author
- Oku-sama wa Joshi Kōsei, another manga series by the same author
