= If Her Flag Breaks =

Japanese light novel series

- Cover of the first volume

彼女がフラグをおられたら (Kanojo ga Furagu o Oraretara)
- Genre: Harem; Romantic comedy
- Light novel
- Written by: Tōka Takei
- Illustrated by: Cuteg
- Published by: Kodansha
- Imprint: Kodansha Ranobe Bunko
- Original run: December 2, 2011 – September 16, 2016
- Volumes: 16
- Manga
- Written by: Tōka Takei
- Illustrated by: Nagian
- Published by: Kodansha
- Magazine: Monthly Shōnen Rival; (November 4, 2011 – February 26, 2014); Monthly Shōnen Sirius; (March 25, 2014 – February 26, 2015)
- Original run: November 4, 2011 – February 26, 2015
- Volumes: 10
- Manga

Kanojo ga Flag o Oraretara: Ō Yūsha yo, Flag o Tateteshimau to wa Nanigoto da!?
- Written by: Nagian
- Published by: Kodansha
- Magazine: Monthly Shōnen Rival; Magazine Lab
- Original run: May 2, 2013 – February 4, 2014
- Volumes: 1
- Manga

Kanojo ga Flag o Oraretara: Root Love
- Written by: Kazuki Ayasaki
- Published by: Kodansha
- Magazine: Suiyōbi no Sirius; Niconico Seiga
- Original run: July 26, 2013 – June 11, 2014
- Volumes: 2
- Anime television series
- Directed by: Ayumu Watanabe
- Written by: Takashi Aoshima
- Music by: Ruka Kawada; Yukari Hashimoto
- Studio: Hoods Entertainment
- Licensed by: NA: NIS America; SA/SEA: Medialink
- Original network: Tokyo MX, Sun TV, TV Aichi, BS11, AT-X
- Original run: April 6, 2014 – June 29, 2014
- Episodes: 13 + OVA
- Manga

Atarashii Kanojo ga Flag o Oraretara
- Written by: Tōka Takei
- Illustrated by: Nagian
- Published by: Kodansha
- Magazine: Monthly Shōnen Sirius; (April 25, 2015 – February 26, 2016); Suiyōbi no Sirius; (March 23 – June 22, 2016)
- Original run: April 25, 2015 – June 22, 2016
- Volumes: 4
- icon

If Her Flag Breaks (Japanese: 彼女がフラグをおられたら, Hepburn: Kanojo ga Furagu o Oraretara), also known as Gaworare (がをられ), is a Japanese light novel series written by Tōka Takei, with illustrations by Cuteg. Kodansha has published 16 volumes from December 2011 to September 2016. A manga adaptation and two spin-off series have been serialized in Kodansha's magazines. An anime adaptation produced by Hoods Entertainment aired in Japan from April to June 2014, and is licensed in North America by NIS America.

== Plot ==
Souta Hatate, a new transfer student to the Hatagaya School, has the ability to see the futures of those around him in the form of flags. He is able to affect those flags based on his interactions with the person in question. He ends up living in a small dorm with many beautiful girls. When he finds a flag of death on himself, Souta learns that in order to be able to change his fate, he has to find and bring together four people: a princess knight, a magician, a cleric, and a shinobi.^{[ch. 5]}

== Characters ==
Souta Hatate (旗立 颯太, Hatate Sōta)
Voiced by: Ryōta Ōsaka
Souta is a transfer student to Hatagaya School who has the ability to see the fate of the people around him in the form of flags atop their heads. He can "break" the flags depending on his actions and thus change the fate of the people around him.^{[ch. 1]} Several weeks prior to the start of the series, he was the sole survivor of the Premium Ambriel (プレミアム・アンブリアル, Puremiamu Anburiaru) a cruise ship that sank. There, he acquired the ability to see and alter flags from Sakura, who played a chess-like game with him during the cruise.^{[ch. 6]} He ends up living in the Quest Dorm (クエスト寮, Kuesuto Ryō) with many beautiful girls.^{[vol. 2]} In the anime, he seeks his sister who was also aboard the Premium Ambriel;^{[ep 2]} the sister is later revealed to be Nanami. He is a Bladefield family member, Nanami's younger brother and Hakua's older brother, thus revealing his name to be Souta Bladefield.^{[ep 12]}
Nanami Knight Bladefield (菜波・K・ブレードフィールド, Nanami Naito Burēdofīrudo)
Voiced by: Ibuki Kido
The thirteenth princess of Bladefield,^{[ch. 2]} (Note: In the first anime episode, Nanami mentions she has 10 brothers and 13 sisters. No mention is made if they all have the same parents.) a small principality in Europe.^{[ep 1]} When she introduces herself to Souta, she does not raise a flag like the other characters. She shows an interest in his ability,^{[ch. 1]} and serves as the "princess knight" in his party.^{[ch. 10]} In the anime, she is revealed to be Souta's older sister,^{[ep 12]} and the daughter of Elia Bladefield.^{[ep 10]}
Akane Mahougasawa (魔法ヶ沢 茜, Mahōgasawa Akane)
Voiced by: Ai Kayano
Akane is the granddaughter to the founder of the renowned Mahougasawa Foundation.^{[ch. 2]} She sports a friendship flag that reappears no matter how many times Souta tries to break it,^{[ch. 2]} and becomes the "magician" in Souta's party.^{[ch. 10]} When she was younger, she was separated from her very first friend by her caretakers, who said that the difference in their classes was pitiable. As a result, she tries to "save" Souta and atone for her broken friendship. She is the first among the Quest Dorm housemates to raise a death flag, which Souta converts into a "route conquered" love flag by kissing her. Afterwards, she falls in love with Souta.^{[ch. 5]} In the anime, Akane's death flag incident occurs before any of the girls have moved in with Souta.^{[ep 1]}
Kikuno Shōkanji (召喚寺 菊乃, Shōkanji Kikuno)
Voiced by: Kana Asumi
Kikuno, nicknamed Okiku by Souta, is a childhood friend who likes to act as an older sister to him and does not relent in doing so for anything, as demonstrated by her "sibling love" flag that dodges Souta's flag-breaking attempts. She represents the "summoner" from the fairy tale.
Megumu Tōzokuyama (盗賊山 恵, Tōzokuyama Megumu)
Voiced by: Kana Hanazawa
Megumu is a schoolmate whom everyone thinks is a girl despite his dressing in the male school uniform. Because Souta recognizes Megumu as a boy, he immediately likes him, and sprouts a string of friendship flags near him.^{[ch. 3]} The schoolmates' ignorance of his gender (and presence) becomes a running gag in the anime with only a couple of times where they get his gender right.^{[ep 2]} He is the "thief" in Souta's party.
Rin Eiyūzaki (英雄崎 凜, Eiyūzaki Rin)
Voiced by: Yoko Hikasa
Rin is a member of the archery club who transfers to Quest Dorm at the request of the student council president to help them win the athletic tournament. Souta notes that she has a "hates men" flag on their first meeting. She is friends with Kikuno and reveals that she had a male childhood friend named Souda whom she regards as her best friend, and who is the only male in the world whom she likes.^{[ep 3]} Even though he moved away several years previously, she keeps in touch with him by text. When she discovers that Souta is her childhood friend, she retreats in embarrassment and reveals a yandere flag which Souta manages to change into a "conquest completed" flag, much to his dismay, ^{[ep 3]}^{[ch. 8]} although the yandere flag sometimes reappears.
Ruri Ninjabayashi (忍者林 瑠璃, Ninjabayashi Ruri)
Voiced by: Ayaka Suwa
Ruri is an android created by the Mahougasawa Foundation. She serves as the "shinobi" in Souta's party,^{[ch. 10]} and is introduced in the story as a secret weapon to help the Quest Dorm in the school's athletic tournament games. She frequently asks yes–no questions regarding actions she is about to perform, and is programmed to act like a little sister to Souta.^{[ch. 7]}
Serika Gin'yūin (吟遊院 芹香, Gin'yūin Serika)
Voiced by: Aoi Yūki
An idol who performs at the school festival and later transfers to Hatagaya, where she moves into the Quest Dorm. Her role in the group is the "bard". Souta and Nanami learn that Souta met Serika previously and that she was able to become an idol because Souta told her that she had a "Success Flag". She did not know the name of the person who said that and thought of him only as "Purple Flagman". She later discovers Souta is that person and develops feelings for him, calling him Hatate-sama.
Mimori Seiteikouji (聖帝小路 美森, Seiteikōji Mimori)
Voiced by: Yukari Tamura
The student council president, and the granddaughter of the school chairman.^{[vol. 2:profiles]} Although she was responsible for placing Souta in the remote and rundown Quest Dorm, she atones by having the building renovated by the school's engineering club.^{[ch. 3]} The school board wants to shut Quest Dorm down, but she arranges for its continued operation provided the tenants win the MVP at the upcoming sports festival. Later, she starts calling Souta by his first name, "Souta-kun", instead of "Hatate Souta".
Tsumugi Ryuukishibara (龍騎士原 月麦, Ryūkishibara Tsumugi)
Voiced by: Aki Toyosaki
Tsumugi is a schoolmate who is rumored to have been with the school before it was built. The rumors persist to the point that her peers call her "baba-sama" (elderly woman). She appears as a young girl wearing a bonnet^{[ch. 3]}^{[vol. 2:profiles]} and acts like a grandmother towards Souta.^{[ch. 12,13]}
Mei Daimyōzamurai (大名侍 鳴, Daimyōzamurai Mei)
Voiced by: Sakura Tange
Mei is a mysterious girl who knows about Souta's powers and his connection to her world.^{[ch. 12]} Her title is number 7 of the House of Shigitoku.^{[vol. 3:profiles]} She shows Souta the "virtual world", which is an artificially created world. After Souta and Mei get back from the virtual world, she sees Souta sleeping and tries to get him rid of the "Death Flag" he has on his head. Then, "the Sacraments" or "Sakura" appears and disposes of her memories and also her ability to see flags. She serves as the party's "samurai".
Kurumiko Daishikyōgawa (大司教河 くるみ子, Daishikyōgawa Kurumiko)
Voiced by: Misaki Kuno
Kurumiko is a middle school girl who is introduced as a popsicle vendor during the school trip to the beach. Her parents were part of the crew of the Premium Ambriel therefore she recognizes Souta and feels guilty for the treatment he was subjected to after the incident, more so even than her losing her parents in the accident.^{[ch. 13]} When she shows Souta a seaside cave and they become trapped by the rising tide, Kurumiko loses hope and a death flag appears. Souta saves her by agreeing to think of her as his little sister and then offering to get her into Hatagaya middle school while having her live with him at Quest Dorm.^{[ch. 14]} She becomes the "cleric" in Souta's party, and her flags are usually ones of story advancement.^{[ch. 13]} Kurumiko speaks very formally, even in casual situations.
Hakua Berserker Bladefield (白亜・B・ブレードフィールド, Hakua Bāsākā Burēdofīrudo)
Voiced by: Ai Kakuma
Hakua is Nanami's younger sister and another princess of Bladefield.^{[ch. 16:sketch in chapter]} She is overly polite and, having been raised in the Bladefield royal family and living a life sheltered from the outside world, is clueless about the life of commoners. She comes to Japan to study the life of commoners with her sister. In the anime, she is revealed to be the daughter of Elia Bladefield,^{[ep 10]} whom she had thought to be her eldest brother, as well as Souta's younger half-sister.^{[ep 12]} It is implied that she has a brother complex, even before she knew that Souta is her brother.
Miyuki MacKenzie (深雪・マッケンシー, Miyuki Makkenshī)
Voiced by: Yuuka Nanri
She is Souta's homeroom teacher^{[ch. 7]} and the resident adviser at Quest Dorm.^{[ch. 14]} When Mei shows Souta an alternate world, he meets an alternate version of Miyuki on the wreck of the Premium Ambriel where he motivates her to live on. She reveals that her great-grandfather's name was Souta Hatate, making her his descendant. Immediately after this he notes that she has a "main character" flag and is told that the alternate Miyuki will now play a major role in how events progress in that world.^{[ch. 16]}
Sakura (桜)
Voiced by: Rina Hidaka
Sakura is a mysterious girl whom Souta meets on the Premium Ambriel and who gives him his powers.^{[ch. 6]} After Mei and Souta visit the alternate world, she removes Mei's flag observing powers and related memories.^{[ch. 16]} Her name is short for Sacrament (サクラメント, Sakuramento). She is nearly identical to, and shares the same voice actress with, Laplace's Demon. The two together were emotion programs designed to act as a conscience for Angel Boat, which cut them off when it rebelled. Laplace's Demon is focused mainly on the will of individuals, and bears a strong affinity to those with strong hearts and a powerful sense of sacrifice, while Sakura is instead focused on the bonds that tie people together.
No. 0
Voiced by: Risa Taneda
Number 0 is an advisor of the Council of the Seven Virtues who appears in the anime series. She needs Souta in order to combat the Angelus Gemeni.^{[ep 11]} She is revealed to be Kagura Bladefield (神楽・ブレードフィールド, Kagura Burēdofīrudo), the founding queen of Bladefield.^{[ep 13]}

== Media ==
=== Light novels ===
If Her Flag Breaks began as a light novel series written by Tōka Takei, with illustrations by Cuteg. The first volume was published on December 2, 2011, under Kodansha's Kodansha Ranobe Bunko. Kodansha has published 16 volumes.

No.	Title	Release date	ISBN
1	Kanojo ga Flag o Oraretara: Ore, Kono Tenkō ga Owattara, Ano Ko to Kekkon Surun da (彼女がフラグをおられたら 俺、この転校が終わったら、あの娘と結婚するんだ)	December 2, 2011	978-4-06-375205-2
2	Kanojo ga Flag o Oraretara: Konna Joshi Bakari no Taiikusai ni Derareru ka, Boku wa Ninin Sankyaku ni Dasasete Morau (彼女がフラグをおられたら こんな女子ばかりの体育祭に出られるか、僕は二人三脚に出させてもらう)	March 2, 2012	978-4-06-375224-3
3	Kanojo ga Flag o Oraretara: Daijōbu, Kono Rinkai Gakkō wa Anzen dakara, Zettai Teki ni Mitsukattari Shinai yo (彼女がフラグをおられたら 大丈夫、この臨海学校は安全だから、絶対敵に見つかったりしないよ)	August 2, 2012	978-4-06-375249-6
4	Kanojo ga Flag o Oraretara: Koko wa Ore ni Makasete, Omae wa Natsuyasumi o Mankitsu Shiro (彼女がフラグをおられたら ここは俺に任せて、お前は夏休みを満喫しろ)	November 30, 2012	978-4-06-375272-4
5	Kanojo ga Flag o Oraretara: Konna Fū ni Minna to Gakuensai no Hanashi o Shita no, Hajimete da na (彼女がフラグをおられたら こんな風にみんなと学園祭の話をしたの、初めてだな)	April 2, 2013	978-4-06-375291-5
6	Kanojo ga Flag o Oraretara: Denwa de wa Kore Ijō Hanasenai. Gakuen-sai no Kuwashii Hanashi wa Atte Kara da (彼女がフラグをおられたら 電話ではこれ以上話せない。学園祭の詳しい話は会ってからだ)	August 2, 2013	978-4-06-375319-6
7	Kanojo ga Flag o Oraretara: Oya, Konna Jikan ni Dare Darō... Santa Claus ka na? (彼女がフラグをおられたら おや、こんな時間に誰だろう…サンタクロースかな？)	November 29, 2013	978-4-06-375350-9
8	Kanojo ga Flag o Oraretara: Ima made Kono Hatsumōde no Omamori no Okage de Nankai mo Inochibiroi Shitanda, Kore Kashite Yaru yo (彼女がフラグをおられたら 今までこの初詣のお守りのお陰で何回も命拾いしたんだ、これ貸してやるよ)	April 2, 2014	978-4-06-375358-5 (regular edition); 978-4-06-358492-9 (limited edition)
9	Kanojo ga Flag o Oraretara: Sekai no Shinri nado, Watashi Hitori de Jūbun da (彼女がフラグをおられたら 世界の真理など、私一人で充分だ)	May 31, 2014	978-4-06-375378-3
10	Kanojo ga Flag o Oraretara: Kono Funatabi ga Owattara, Watashi, Ohime-sama ni Naru no (彼女がフラグをおられたら この船旅が終わったら、私、お姫様になるの)	July 2, 2014	978-4-06-375390-5
11	Kanojo ga Flag o Oraretara Kon'na Yuka ga Nukeru Ryō ni Haira Renai, Watashi wa Tsuno Heya ni Kaera sete Moraukara ne! (彼女がフラグをおられたら こんな床が抜ける寮にはいられない、私は角部屋に帰らせて貰うからね！)	December 2, 2014	978-4-06-381408-8 (regular edition); 978-4-06-358714-2 (limited edition)
12	Kanojo ga Flag o Oraretara Daijōbu, Kono Taiiku Matsuri wa Anzendakara, Zettai MVP o Toreru wa yo (彼女がフラグをおられたら 大丈夫、この体育祭は安全だから、絶対MVPを取れるわよ)	April 2, 2015	978-4-06-381449-1
13	Kanojo ga Flag o Oraretara Koko wa Shūgakuryokō-sei ni Makasete, Hayaku Makuranage ni iku no yo (彼女がフラグをおられたら ここは修学旅行生に任せて、早く枕投げに行くのよ)	July 31, 2015	978-4-06-381475-0
14	Kanojo ga Flag o Oraretara Chigau Suiei Taikai de Deaete Itara, Watashitachi Shin'yū ni Nareta Kamo ne…… (彼女がフラグをおられたら ちがう水泳大会で出会えていたら、私達親友になれたかもね……)	December 29, 2015	978-4-06-381504-7
15	Kanojo ga Flag o Oraretara Sukoshi Tsukareta wa…-ji no Natsuyasumi Made Nemura Sete Morau ne… (彼女がフラグをおられたら >少し疲れたわ…次の夏休みまで眠らせてもらうね…)	April 28, 2016	978-4-06-381530-6
16	Kanojo ga Flag o Oraretara Maid no Miyage yo, Saigo ni Sotsugyōshiki no Koto o Oshiete Ageru wa (彼女がフラグをおられたら 冥土の土産よ、最期に卒業式のことを教えてあげるわ)	September 2, 2016	978-4-06-381548-1

=== Manga ===
A manga adaptation illustrated by Nagian began serialization in the December 2011 issue of Kodansha's Monthly Shōnen Rival magazine, published on November 4, 2011. It was serialized in the magazine until the April 2014 issue, published on February 26, 2014, and the manga was transferred to Monthly Shōnen Sirius, being published from the May 2014 issue, on March 25, 2014. The manga finished in the April 2015 issue of Monthly Shōnen Sirius, released on February 26, 2015. Kodansha compiled the series into ten tankōbon volumes, published from March 2, 2012, to April 2, 2015. A second series, titled Atarashii Kanojo ga Flag o Oraretara (新しい彼女がフラグをおられたら), was serialized in Monthly Shōnen Sirius from April 25, 2015, to February 26, 2016. It was later transferred to Suiyōbi no Sirius website, where it ran from March 23 to June 22, 2016. Kodansha compiled its chapters into four tankōbon volumes, released from July 31, 2015, to September 2, 2016.

A spin-off series is titled Kanojo ga Flag o Oraretara: Ō Yūsha yo, Flag o Tateteshimau to wa Nanigoto da!? (彼女がフラグをおられたら おお勇者よ、フラグを立ててしまうとは何事だ!?), or Gawoyū (がをゆう) for short, was published in Monthly Shōnen Rival from the June 2013 issue, published on May 2, 2013, to the March 2014 issue, published on February 4, 2014. It was also published on Magazine Lab website. The series shows Souta and the girls as characters in a fantasy role-playing game world. Kodansha released a tankōbon volume on May 30, 2014.

A second spin-off series, titled Kanojo ga Flag o Oraretara: Root Love (彼女がフラグをおられたら ～ルートラブ～), or Gaworabu (がをラブ), by Kazuki Ayasaki, was serialized on Suiyōbi no Sirius and Niconico's Niconico Seiga web services from July 26, 2013, to June 11, 2014. Its chapters were compiled into two tankōbon volumes, published on April 2 and July 2, 2014.

No.	Release date	ISBN
1	March 2, 2012	978-4-06-380208-5
Chapters 1–5
Transfer student Souta Hatate meets classmate Nanami Knight Bladefield, who confronts him about his habit of looking at the tops of people's heads and how he saved some people from a trailer collision. Souta reveals to her that he is able to see the fate of someone's future in the form of flags, and that he is able to "break" the flag by his actions. They discover that childhood friend Kikuno Shōkanji has a flag of love, and Akane Mahougasawa has a flag of friendship. He takes the girls to his dorm, which is in poor shape; they ask long-time student Tsumugi Ryūkishibara who gets student council president Mimori Seiteikōji to renovate the dorm, employing effeminate admiring boy Megumu Tōzokuyama, after which he and the girls move in as tenants. He scrambles to save Akane when she shows a death flag.
2	August 2, 2012	978-4-06-380231-3
Chapters 6–10
Upset about the establishment of the co-ed Quest Dormitory (クエスト寮, Kuesuto ryō), the school's board of directors pressure Mimori to shut them down. Mimori proposes that the residents can prove their worth by becoming the MVP of the school's week-long athletic games. After performing miserably on the first day, the team gets some help from android Ruri Ninjabayashi and archery athlete Rin Eiyūzaki. Rin trains the team for the sixth day of events. Although the team finishes second overall, the board members are impressed, and agree to retain the residence.
3	November 30, 2012	978-4-06-380248-1
Chapters 11–14
While the council members from the other world debate Souta's presence as a threat, Souta goes on his promised dates with the Quest Dorm residents. He encounters Mei Daimyōzamurai who knows of his abilities. He must attend both sessions of swimming and academic summer school camps, each of which has Quest Dorm residents. The swimming sessions bring traumatic memories of the shipwreck, and are compounded when he attends the academic camp and finds they are switching locales to the beach for the day. He befriends Kurumiko Daishikyōgawa, the potential "clergy" character for his party. After a crisis situation that involves the tide, he invites her to be his little sister.
4	April 2, 2013	978-4-06-380264-1
Chapters 15–18
The classmate guys ask Souta to find a mysterious girl in a white dress. He discovers the girl is Megumu, but uses Mimori as a decoy, and learns of her back story. With the help of Ruri, he and Mei visit the alternate world where dorm advisor Miyuki is a student there who bears his last name and a main character flag. When they return, his death flag becomes large. After Mei tries to break it, Sakura wipes Mei of the knowledge of the flags. For summer break, he is taken to Akane's mansion, where some of the Quest Dorm residents gather, but he gets stuck in the girls outdoor bath.
5	August 2, 2013	978-4-06-380278-8
Chapters 19–22
6	November 29, 2013	978-4-06-380294-8
Chapters 23–26
7	April 2, 2014	978-4-06-376973-9 (regular edition); 978-4-06-358493-6 (limited edition)
Chapters 27-30
8	July 2, 2014	978-4-06-377025-4
Chapters 31-34
9	December 2, 2014	978-4-06-377093-3
Chapters 35-38
10	April 2, 2015	978-4-06-377168-8
Chapters 39-42

=== Anime ===
An anime adaptation, produced by Hoods Entertainment and directed by Ayumu Watanabe, aired from April 6 to June 29, 2014, on Tokyo MX and later on Sun TV, TV Aichi, BS11 and AT-X. NIS America simulcasted the series on Crunchyroll with English subtitles. The opening theme song is "Cupid Review (クピドゥレビュー) by Aoi Yūki, while the ending theme song is "Kanojo ga Flag o Tateru Wake" (彼女がフラグを立てる理由) by Yell, a group composed of Ibuki Kido, Ai Kayano, Kana Asumi, Kana Hanazawa, Yōko Hikasa and Ayaka Suwa.

No.	Title (Note: All English titles are taken from Crunchyroll.)	Original release date
1	"I'm Going to Marry Her Once I Leave This School"; Transliteration: "Ore, Kono Tenkō ga Owattara, Ano Ko to Kekkon Surun da" (Japanese: 俺、この転校が終わったら、あの娘と結婚するんだ)	April 6, 2014
On her way to school, Nanami Knight Bladefield encounters a boy who saves a group of people from a trailer collision. After observing that guy Souta Hatate in class where he rudely responds to classmates, she confronts him about his habit of looking at the tops of people's heads, and learns he has the ability of seeing someone's future in the form of flags and the ability to "break" the flag by his actions. They meet Akane Mahougasawa who bears a flag of friendship that persists even after he breaks it several times. Souta takes the girls to his residence, the Quest Dorm, which is in poor shape. Souta scrambles to save Akane when she shows a death flag.
2	"Girls are in the Dorm. But I can't say it yet. Wait Until Tomorrow."; Transliteration: "Kono Ryō ni Anetachi ga Iru. Daga, Ima wa Mada Ienai. Ashita made Mattekure" (Japanese: この寮に姉たちがいる。だが、今はまだ言えない。明日まで待ってくれ)	April 13, 2014
Souta recalls his meeting with Sakura aboard the Premium Ambriel. He meets childhood friend Okiku who has a big sister flag. They have the Quest Dorm renovated, thanks to student council president Mimori Seiteikouji's volunteers. Souta meets effeminate boy Megumu, who along with Akane, Okiku, and Nanami, move in to keep the dorm open. He later discovers a letter and recalls the encounter with Sakura that led to his attaining his powers and his mission of gathering a party of characters.
3	"Leave it to Me, There is a Chance We're Going to Win This Athletic Meet"; Transliteration: "Makaseteoke, Kono Taiikusai wa 99.9% no Kakuritsu de Oretachi no Kachi da" (Japanese: 任せておけ、この体育祭は99.9%の確率で俺たちの勝ちだ)	April 20, 2014
Souta wakes up in his room, only to find out Akane and Megumu is in his room, led by Okiku. Ruri is delivered to the Quest Dorm. The Quest Dorm is forced to enter Hatagaya Academy's Sport Festival and win the MVP in order to prevent the dorm from being demolished, as well as prevent Souta from being expelled. Rin is sent to help Quest Dorm in winning the MVP title, so she starts an extreme training routine. Despite the "hate guy" flag she possess, Rin once had a male friend named "Souda", whom she still exchange mails. It is revealed that "Souda" is actually Souta, and they were childhood friends.
4	"We're Almost to the Goal. The Track Meet 'll End Just Fine."; Transliteration: "Ato Mō Sukoshi de Gōru da. Kore de Buji Taiikusai mo Owaru zo" (Japanese: あともう少しでゴールだ。これで無事体育祭も終わるぞ)	April 27, 2014
During the first day, Quest Dorm members are excelling the Sports Festival. But their performance dropped, and their ranking dropped to the 8th place during the second-to-last day. During night before the last day of the Sports Festival, Souta talked with Ruri about his condition. While reciting the letter he received, he activated Ruri's "First Flag, Program Code". Souta is given a vision about Quest Dorm, where there exist an underground passage below the dormitory. During the last day of the Sports Festival, under the guidance of the Victory Flag, the Quest Dorm received MVP title despite ranked 2nd.
5	"Believe and Wait for Me. I'm not Going to be Late for My Date With Everyone."; Transliteration: "Shinjite Matteitekure. Minna to no Dēto ni Chikoku Nante Suru Mono ka." (Japanese: 信じて待っていてくれ。みんなとのデートに遅刻なんてするものか)	May 4, 2014
Souta tried checking the door to the underground passage, but are unable to find the door. Everyone complained that Souta agreed to go on a date with Akane, so Souta goes on a date with everyone but Nanami, who chooses to stay at Quest Dorm and Ruri, who stayed behind. Souta and Ruri examine the underground passage, where they found a stone chest that wrote the same content as Souta's letter. The Samurai, Mei appears.
6	"Phew. Don't scare me like that. I guess you're just a little sister." Transliteration: "Fū...Amari Odorokaseru na yo, Tada no Imōto Janai ka" (Japanese: ふう……あまり驚かせるなよ、ただの妹じゃないか)	May 11, 2014
Mei transfers to Hatagaya Academy as Souta's classmate. Souta and the Quest Dorm members go on a trip to the beach and forest. Souta is revealed to have a fear of the ocean due to his traumatic experience after surviving the Premium Ambriel incident. Souta meet Kurumiko, the Cleric, which exhibit the "Story Flag", which show story progression. Kurumiko's parent is revealed to be the victims of Premium Ambriel. While Kurumiko shows Souta her secret place inside a cave, they were trapped by the high tide. Souta saved both of them by breaking Kurumiko's death flag by making Kurumiko his little sister, just like how he made Okiku his older sister. After being saved, they met a mysterious girl in white.
7	"I Learned Something Amazing. I'll Hide Myself Before I can be Erased"; Transliteration: "Tondemonai Koto o Shitteshimatta. Kesareru Mae ni, Ore wa Mi o Kakusu" (Japanese: とんでもないことを知ってしまった。消される前に俺は身を隠す)	May 18, 2014
The mysterious girl revealed to be Megumu, which is forced to crossdress by his older sisters that hangs out in the nearby mansion. In order to bring Kurumiko back to Hatagaya Academy, Souta asked for Mimori's help, which in return he needs to go on a date with her. Despite Mimori's best efforts, only Mei are capable of bringing Kurumiko to Quest Dorm, which makes Kurumiko being attached to her as a result. It is also revealed that Mimori and Tsumugi are also becoming members of Quest Dorm, and, by Kurumiko's persuasion, Mei took the same action to live in Quest Dorm. Souta talked with Mei about his abilities. Mei brought him to a parallel world, where Souta did not exist, thus triggering the deaths of Nanami, Akane and Kurumiko. Mei brought him to Premium Ambriel, where he meet Miyuki, now Miyuki Hatate, who replaces Souta's role as the protagonist. Souta's Death Flag triggered, and Mei tries to save him by breaking the Death Flag, and while doing so, she learns about Souta's true destiny. Despite being unable to do so, Souta is saved, but Sacrament comes and wipe all of Mei's memory about flags.
8	"I'll catch up to you. Have I ever broken a promise to you before?" Transliteration: "Ato kara Kanarazu Oitsuku. Ore ga Yakusoku o Yabutta Koto ga Atta ka?" (Japanese: 後から必ず追いつく。俺が約束を破ったことがあったか?)	May 25, 2014
During summer break, while spending his holidays with Okiku and Rin, Souta is kidnapped by Riru and brought to Akane's house, to fulfill Akane's wish to meet him. As a result, Okiku, Rin, Megumu, Mei and Kurumiko went to Akane's house. Nanami, knowing the Quest Dorm members are at Akane's house, are frustrated because she wasn't invited as well. Thus, the Quest Dorm members (plus Ruri) decided to meet Nanami at her country in Principality of Bladefield. On their way to the capital, Twinblade, Souta met Hakua, the 14th Princess of Bladefield, Nanami's half-sister. Later they are being chased by Ruri's clone, which is programmed to assassinate Hakua and Nanami. Souta felt his power increases again and used his own power to save both of them from the assassination, though that makes them separated from the main group.
9	"Someday, it'd be Nice if We Could all Go to a Festival Together Again"; Transliteration: "Mata Itsuka, Kō Shite Minna Issho ni Omatsuri ni Ikeru to Ii na" (Japanese: またいつか、こうしてみんな一緒にお祭りに行けるといいな)	June 1, 2014
The Quest Dorm members, alongside Souta, Nanami and Hakua safely arrived at Bladefield. But their happiness was not for long, that Nanami and Hakua's father are said to be deceased recently. The first prince, Elia, then uncover the truth; he is the real father of Nanami and Hakua. A condolence ceremony is then done to mourn the deceased king, and celebrate Elia's coronation as the new king at the same time. Souta then met No. 0, the leader of the Council of Seven Virtues. She then explains about Bladefield's fairy tale, about a nameless person who has been changed into the flag, two princesses and ten heroes. Souta realized his destiny that awaits him at the end of the path. No. 0 asks Souta to help her to save the world with his power.
10	"Hold this for Me. The Winner of the Beauty Contest is Written Here."; Transliteration: "Koitsu o Azukatte Oitekure. Misukon no Yūshōsha no Namae ga Kakareteiru nda" (Japanese: こいつを預かっておいてくれ。ミスコンの優勝者の名前が書かれているんだ)	June 8, 2014
Hakua transferred to Hatagaya Academy. Hatagaya Academy organizes the School Festival. Souta is tricked into recommending all the Quest Dorm members (besides him, Kurumiko, who is not learning at Hatagaya and Tsumugi, who is too old) a total of 9 people, to enter the Miss Hatagaya Academy Beauty Contest. During the beauty contest, Nanami, who realized that Souta is down, tries to cheer him up with a few speeches, which makes her the winner of the contest. As the winner, Nanami received "Souta Escort Free Pass", which makes her able to get anything in the festival for free as long as she is accompanied by Souta. At the stairs near the shoe lockers, both of them met a mysterious girl in glasses, who is seem to be running from something.
11	"We Don't all Have to Dance. I can Dance by Myself"; Transliteration: "Minna de Odoru Made mo Nai, Koko wa Ore Hitori ga Odoreba Jūbun da" (Japanese: みんなで踊るまでもない、ここは俺一人が踊れば十分だ)	June 15, 2014
The mysterious girl is shown to be Serika Gin'yūin, also known as Sericchan, the idol loved by Japan. She is supposed to hold a concert during the final day of the festival. Souta and Nanami learnt that Sericchan managed to become an idol because Souta saved her, by saying she has a "Success Flag", though she doesn't know the identity of that person, and she named him as "Purple Flagman". Souta realized that Sericchan is the Bard. During the concert, Souta's power increases once more, and the time freezes up. No. 0 appears and tells Souta that he should not be in the world, or the world will be destroyed. So, despite Souta had promised the Quest Dorm members to dance with them, he breaks the promises and uses his power to make everyone forgets about him. Nanami, unaffected by Souta's power, is the only person who is able to remember Souta.
12	"It's a Cruel World. I'm Going to Take a Look in the Shadows."; Transliteration: "Hidoi Sekai da na, Chotto Ura no Yōsu o Mite Kuru yo" (Japanese: ひどい世界だな、ちょっと裏の様子を見てくるよ)	June 22, 2014
In the servers, Souta desperately fights the Angelus Gemini in order to protect his world and his friends by placing "Death Flag" upon his enemies. Meanwhile, Nanami found out everyone has forgotten about Souta, and his existence is overwritten. During their graduation day, all Quest Dorm members are going for separate ways. The Quest Dorm is said to be demolished soon. Nanami breaks into Souta's room, and find the letter that Souta received, written by her handwriting, thus breaking Souta's Protect Mode. Riru, who always remembered everything, finally tells Nanami the truth; Nanami is Souta's missing sister. Separated into two, half of Nanami is locked in the jail in Principality of Bladefield, in which she manages to escape and hides inside Ruri. Understanding everything, Nanami unites with her other self. Denying the bittersweet end of the fairy tale, Nanami alongside the Quest Dorm members aim for the happy ending, and went to the underground passage to open the gate to reach and help Souta. Souta, who is tired from all the battle, is saved by the Quest Dorm members, who arrived near Premium Ambriel.
13	"If His Flag Breaks"; Transliteration: "Kare ga Flag o Oraretara" (Japanese: 彼がフラグをおられたら)	June 29, 2014
The girls fight the Angelus Gemini, while Souta wonders why they came, feeling he has nothing to give them in return. Akane assures him that's not true, and eventually professes her love for him before she goes to fight. The Premium Ambriel absorbs the remaining creatures to charge a final attack, while Souta regains memory of his past as he tries to stop the attack. It is revealed that he once knew Akane, Kikuno, Megumi, Rin and Nanami at one point in the real world, but due to an accident, Souta chose to have a little girl, known as Laplace's Demon take their death flags and have them formed on him so they would survive. The price being the girls were to lose their memories of the event, and Souta and the girls were to forget having ever met each other while Souta despaired his life. Back in the present, Souta then uses his full power against the Premium Ambriel, and while his strength alone is not enough, he manages to destroy it with the help of the other girls coming and aiding him. During this time his death flag breaks. Souta then wakes up in the real world, where Number 0 speaks to him about the state of things and the truth about Sakura and Laplace's Demon. She also says that he was in an accident before he enrolled at a school, so she merged his conscious with many virtual worlds. Before she leaves, she states that the time he spent in the virtual world was but a flash in reality, hence nobody else shares his memories of it, including Nanami who dived into the virtual world to save him. Later, Souta comes across Quest Dorm and finds Akane there. After saving her from falling through the floor, Akane remembers him while Sakura and Laplace's Demon observe them. The episode ends with the girls in front of Quest Dorm smiling.
14 (OVA)	"Christmas? Do You Think I'd Make Use of Something Like That?"; Transliteration: "Kurisumasu? Sonna Mono ga Boku ni Tsūyō Suru to Omou no ka?" (Japanese: クリスマス?そんな物が僕に通用すると思うのか?)	December 2, 2014
The girls and Souta are heading to class, wondering about what they're going to do for Christmas. When they enter the class however, there's a huge announcement written on the blackboard that says that Christmas will be cancelled. Immediately afterwards it cuts to Souta and the girls (including Miyuki-sensei and Serican) celebrating Souta somehow saving Christmas. They have another toast, and Rin gains another Yandere flag when she hears that Okiku already cut the cake. Souta is able to cut down the flag by cutting the cake with Rin. Everybody then draws straws to see who is the "King". The "King" gives commands to everyone else, which must be followed in the spirit of Christmas. Once the games are over, they spend an overly long time exchanging presents (due to the girls feeling bad for everyone else who didn't get Souta's present), before Souta reveals he bought presents for everyone. Souta then spends time with each of the girls (Akane acts as a lap pillow, Megumu gets Souta to put blankets on him, Miyuki-sensei gets a massage). During Serica's turn, she brings Nanami along and unintentionally discovers Souta is her mysterious savior, the Purple-Flagman. This causes her to break down, until Nanami drags Souta out of the room, after which she calms down and develops feelings for Souta. Nanami and Souta go outside, and upon seeing the snow fall, remark that it is really a Christmas miracle that brought them together. Just before they kiss, the front doors open and everyone else tumbles out. Souta wishes everyone a Merry Christmas, and they all go back inside.

== Reception ==
Rebecca Silverman of Anime News Network wrote that the anime was a "fairly classic harem show," but that each episode throws something unexpected at the viewers to keep their attention. She criticized the overuse of pastel coloring, the female characters having either generic designs or annoying personality traits and felt the ending was rushed.
