= Manyu Scroll =

Japanese manga series and its franchise

- First tankōbon volume cover, featuring Chifusa Manyu

魔乳秘剣帖 (Manyū Hiken-chō)
- Genre: Action; Comedy; Historical
- Manga
- Written by: Hideki Yamada
- Published by: Enterbrain
- Imprint: Techgian Style
- Magazine: Tech Gian
- Original run: July 21, 2005 – November 21, 2011
- Volumes: 7
- Anime television series
- Directed by: Hiraku Kaneko
- Produced by: Akira Matsui; Hiroaki Ooki; Yoshiyuki Ito
- Written by: Seishi Minakami
- Music by: Miyu Nakamura
- Studio: Hoods Entertainment
- Licensed by: Crunchyroll
- Original network: TV Kanagawa, Tokyo MX, Chiba TV, KBS Kyoto, Sun Television, AT-X
- Original run: July 11, 2011 – September 26, 2011
- Episodes: 12 + 8 OVAs
- icon

Manyu Scroll (魔乳秘剣帖, Manyū Hiken-chō; lit. 'The Secret Scroll of the Magic Breast Sword') is a Japanese manga series written and illustrated by Hideki Yamada. It was published in Enterbrain's bishōjo game magazine Tech Gian from July 2005 to November 2011, with its chapters collected in seven tankōbon volumes. Set in a parallel version of the Taihei Edo period, the series follows Chifusa, a busty kunoichi learning to be samurai. A 12-episode anime television series adaptation, produced by Hoods Entertainment, aired from July to September 2011.

== Plot ==
In a land ruled by the Tokugawa shogunate, big breasts mean everything. Those women who have huge breasts are guaranteed wealth and popularity. The women who lack them are not considered "human". Members of the ruling Manyū clan help raise future big-breasted women. Written on a secret scroll possessed by the clan, there are said to be various techniques on how to grow big and beautiful breasts. Chifusa is to be the successor of the clan. However, she takes the secret scroll and runs away with it, hoping to fight against the cruel world that the Manyū clan has created.

== Characters ==
Chifusa Manyū (魔乳 千房, Manyū Chifusa)
Voiced by: Eri Kitamura (Drama CD), Minako Kotobuki (anime)
Chifusa is the successor of the Manyū clan, a skilled samurai known for her hotheaded and impulsive nature. Despite her temper, she is deeply loyal and kind-hearted. Due to her upbringing, she often finds herself distracted by buxom women, a weakness exploited by her pursuers. Rejecting her clan's tradition of judging women by breast size, she abandons her family and steals the Scroll of Secrets, which contains techniques for breast enlargement. She masters the Breast Flow (乳流れ, Chichi-nagare), a unique ability to manipulate breast size, though initially, she can only absorb others' breast mass. Determined to master this technique, she seeks to ensure all women in Japan have equal opportunity, opposing the societal favoritism toward large breasts and their exploitation.
Kaede (楓)
Voiced by: Ryō Hirohashi (Drama CD), Aki Toyosaki (anime)
Kaede is Chifusa's lifelong friend and devoted attendant, having abandoned the Manyū clan alongside her. Though technically subordinate, she frequently takes charge, particularly in managing finances or restraining Chifusa's impulsive tendencies. Her deep loyalty borders on possessiveness, as she often reacts with jealousy when others show interest in Chifusa. She openly admires Chifusa's physique, leading many to assume they share a romantic relationship. While her feelings are never explicitly confirmed, her behavior suggests an attachment beyond mere friendship.
Ouka Sayama (狭山 桜花, Sayama Ōka)
Voiced by: Mamiko Noto
Ouka is a skilled assassin and swordswoman sent by the Manyū clan to capture Chifusa. Cold and merciless in combat, her abilities equal or surpass Chifusa's. Their conflict began in youth when Chifusa first accidentally used the Breast Flow technique on her during a duel, leaving Ouka flat-chested. After suffering the harsh treatment reserved for small-breasted women, she found refuge under Muneyuki, who disregarded societal prejudice against her. This act inspires her fierce devotion to him, suggesting deeper feelings. Her personal vendetta against Chifusa drives her relentless pursuit.
Kagefusa Manyū (魔乳 影房, Manyū Kagefusa)
Voiced by: Yumi Tōma (Drama CD), Kaoru Mizuhara (anime)
Kagefusa is Chifusa's sadistic older paternal half-sister and a master of the teppo. A staunch supporter of the Manyū clan's traditions, she resents Chifusa for being chosen as successor despite having a smaller bust. Their conflict escalates when Chifusa accidentally uses the Breast Flow technique on her, stealing her breasts and forcing her to rely on an inflating bra. Initially consumed by vengeance, Kagefusa eventually relents after Chifusa vows to restore her bust once mastering the technique. This reconciliation softens her outlook, making her more easygoing, though she retains her cruel streak.
Muneyuki Manyū (魔乳 胸幸, Manyū Muneyuki)
Voiced by: Kenji Hamada
Chifusa's brother, whom she initially admires greatly. He is the chief Manyū Breast Inspector because of his great, natural ability to analyze them. It is because of this job that he despises large breasts, since he claims that after years of staring and analyzing them he has grown tired of them. After Chifusa's defection, his darker side comes up, revealing that he is as ruthless as his father and is willing to go to brutal lengths to preserve Manyū rule. It is implied that he is either in love with or holds certain feelings for Ouka.
Kokage (小影)
Voiced by: Misato Fukuen
Kagefusa's assistant and best friend. Very much like what Kaede is to Chifusa, Kokage is eternally loyal to Kagefusa, even though Kagefusa is a lot sterner to Kokage than Chifusa is to Kaede. Kokage is very inexperienced in combat and commonly acts as a spy and reconnaissance agent for Kagefusa, looking for information to track down Chifusa and Kaede's location.
Munenori Manyū (魔乳 胸則, Manyū Munenori)
Voiced by: Hidekatsu Shibata (Drama CD), Atsushi Ono (anime)
The lord of the Manyū clan, the ruler of Japan and Chifusa's father. He is the leader of the Manyū. He preserves the Manyū's system of rule, in which a woman's worth is judged on by the size of her breasts, through a totalitarian demeanour of government. He is shown to be very cold and vengeful, issuing a death warrant for his own daughter because of her defection and spares no expense to have her stopped.
Kyoka Manyū (魔乳 胸華, Manyū Kyōka)
Voiced by: Ayahi Takagaki
Chifusa's kind-hearted older sister. She is the most calm person of her family and despite her general mercy and good nature, she still is an enemy to Chifusa after her defection.
Hatomune Mie (三重 鳩宗, Mie Hatomune)
Voiced by: Chō (Drama CD), Tōru Ōkawa (anime)
Mie is a feudal lord who first encounters Chifusa while judging a risqué contest she enters to repay an innkeeper's kindness. After accidentally seeing her bare breasts, he becomes fixated on touching them, abandoning his position to search for her. When they later reunite, he aids Kaede in rescuing Chifusa from a rival lord's palace. Though offered the chance to fondle Chifusa's breasts as a reward, he respectfully declines, demonstrating personal growth. He ultimately returns to his duties as lord, his obsession tempered by newfound maturity.
Ame Shuji (魔乳 胸華, Shūji Ame)
An assassin for the Manyū clan who was sent to assassinate Chifusa and retrieve the scroll from her possession. She invited a traveling Chifusa to her home where she attempted to steal the scroll but was caught by Chifusa, resulting in a duel between the two of them where Chifusa held her own initially, until Ame revealed her skill by secreting blinding liquid from her nipples at Chifusa's eyes.

== Media ==
=== Manga ===
Written and illustrated by Hideki Yamada, Manyu Scroll was first published as a one-shot in Enterbrain's bishōjo game magazine Tech Gian on July 21, 2005. (Note: Published in the magazine's September 2005 issue, released on July 21 of that same year.) The manga was eventually serialized in the magazine and finished on November 21, 2011. Enterbrain collected its chapters in seven tankōbon volumes, released from March 24, 2007, to January 25, 2012.

No.	Release date	ISBN
1	March 24, 2007	978-4-7577-3487-6
2	February 25, 2008	978-4-7577-4005-1
3	October 25, 2008	978-4-7577-4496-7
4	October 24, 2009	978-4-04-726098-6
5	May 24, 2010	978-4-04-726565-3
6	June 25, 2011	978-4-04-727379-5
7	January 25, 2012	978-4-04-727832-5

=== Drama CD ===
A drama CD produced by Chara-Ani was released on October 16, 2010.

=== Internet radio show ===
An internet radio show, entitled Manyū Hiken-chō: Oedo Radio (魔乳秘剣帖 大江戸らじを, Manyū Hikenchō: Ōedo Rajio), aired on Onsen from July 4 to October 24, 2011. The show was hosted by Tōru Ōkawa and Mamiko Noto, the respective voices for Hatomune Mie and Ouka Sayama.

=== Anime ===
A 12-episode anime television series adaptation was produced by Hoods Entertainment, directed by Hiraku Kaneko, with series composition by Seishi Minakami, music composed by Miyu Nakamura, character designs by Jun Takagi, and produced by Akira Matsui, Hiroaki Ooki, and Yoshiyuki Ito. The series' opening theme is "Fate" (運命, Unmei) and the ending theme is "Futatsu no Ashiato" (二つの足跡; "Two Footprints"), both performed by Airi. The series was broadcast on TV Kanagawa and other networks, including Tokyo MX, Chiba TV, KBS Kyoto, Sun Television, and AT-X, from July 11 to September 26, 2011. An uncensored "Director's Cut" version was streamed on the ShowTime's video portal service. The episodes were collected on four DVD and Blu-ray sets, released from October 4, 2011, to January 7, 2012; each volume included a short original video animation (OVA) titled Binyū Tanren-hō Nyū-Togi (美乳鍛錬☆ちちとぎ), and a picture drama titled Kaede no Chifusa-sama Oppai Seichō Kiroku (楓の千房様おっぱい成長記録).

Crunchyroll began streaming the series, 13 years after the original broadcast, on January 16, 2024.

No.	Title	Original release date
1	"Chifusa Betrays Her Clan" "Chifusa Rihan Su" (千房 離反す)	July 11, 2011
In a world in which having large breasts means everything, the successor of the powerful Manyu family, Chifusa Manyu, defects and steals the Manyu Scroll of Secrets (which contains all the Manyu secret techniques for breast enlargement), but is wounded during her escape. She is found by a woman who was recently attacked by Kagefusa, a Manyu assassin and Chifusa's sister, resulting in her breasts becoming small and effectively making her poor. The woman becomes jealous of Chifusa and attempts to sever her breasts in a fit of rage, but Chifusa manages to calm her down. As Chifusa is about to leave, she is confronted by Kagefusa, who had also captured Chifusa's comrade, Kaede, and severed her breasts. As Chifusa stands against Kagefusa, she uses a special technique which steals Kagefusa's breasts and adds them to her own. As Kagefusa is forced to retreat, Kaede decides to join Chifusa on her journey.
2	"Assassins! The Path of Boobalicious Dreams!" "Shikaku! Chichi Mudō" (刺客! 乳夢道)	July 18, 2011
Running low on money, Chifusa and Kaede earn some money by utilising Chifusa's assets. They go to an inn run by a well-endowed landlady. However, this landlady turns out to be a Manyu assassin who drugs both Chifusa and Kaede and then hypnotizes them with her breasts, intending to turn them into her lesbian love slaves. However, before she can finish taking control of their minds, the hypnotized Kaede pounces at the landlady's breasts, releasing Chifusa from the mind control effect and giving her the chance to absorb the landlady's breasts. As they move on, Chifusa comes to realize about her ability to alter a woman's breasts using the Breast Flow technique, and vows to learn more about it so she can return Kaede's breasts to normal.
3	"Spirited Aboob" "Kaiki Chichi-kakushi" (怪奇 乳隠し)	July 25, 2011
Having not eaten for days, Chifusa and Kaede get a job at a maid bar, but soon get fired due to Chifusa's short temper around the rowdy customers. Collapsing due to hunger, they are rescued by a man whose daughter was stricken by a mysterious breast disappearance. The man asks Chifusa to take his daughter's place in a contest against a neighboring village to please Hatomune Mie, a rowdy landlord. The opposing team sends a Manyu assassin to attack Chifusa, but she manages to beat him and wins the contest the next morning. Although Hatomune later hears word about Chifusa's true identity, he allows her to go, having been mesmerized by her breasts. After she leaves, Hatomune vows to find Chifusa again and get to touch her breasts.
4	"The Lady Diver and Her Breasts" "Ama to Oppai" (海女とおっぱい)	August 1, 2011
With Chifusa and Kaede coming up short on a food bill, they are forced to become divers by the restaurant's owner, Oiso. As Oiso laments how her large breasts keep her from diving properly, her assistant, Mizuki, is attacked by a large octopus which has been causing trouble for the village for years. The next day as everyone hunts for the octopus, Oiso is captured while saving Kaede from the octopus, so Chifusa dives in after her. With the octopus using Oiso as a shield, Chifusa uses the Breast Flow technique to attack the octopus without hurting Oiso, absorbing her breasts in the process. As the octopus attacks Chifusa before she can come up for air, Oiso uses her newfound freedom to kill the octopus, giving Chifusa the credit as thanks.
5	"The Bum and the Boobs" "Rokudenashi to Oppai" (ろくでなしとおっぱい)	August 8, 2011
Chifusa and Kaede save a woman called Osuzu from four "monsters" that assaulted her and tried to molest her breasts. At Osuzu's village, both heroines meet a man named Yasuke, who lost his massively-breasted wife two years prior and struggles with different jobs to maintain his four kids, and whom Osuzu is hopelessly in love with. In order to help Osuzu, Chifusa and Kaede convince Osuzu's grandfather to organize a hunt for the monsters, leaving Yasuke to take care of Osuzu; ultimately Osuzu manages to charm Yasuke and they begin dating. During the hunt, Chifusa and Kaede stumble upon the monsters and after a brief fight they discover that they were just Yasuke's four children, who played with their captured women's breasts because they missed their deceased mother's bosom. Chifusa strikes a deal with them and makes them promise not to assault any more women after she lets them play with her own breasts for an entire afternoon.
6	"Kagefusa, Once More" "Kagefusa Futatabi" (影房ふたたび)	August 15, 2011
After an encounter with some guards, Chifusa ends up absorbing several pairs of breasts, which make her own breasts enormous and massively heavy, limiting her mobility. She and Kaede travel to a temple where a nun named Jifuni theorises that the reason for Chifusa absorbing breasts is because of her own selfish desire for her mother's comfort. Chifusa is put on a training course to cleanse and rebuild a pile of rocks that form a nipple-like fountain in order to purify her breasts. However, just before she completes the fountain, she is approached by Kagefusa, who steals the Manyu scroll only to find the Breast Flow technique cannot be learned, as it was passed down from her mother's bloodline. Noticing Kagefusa's sorrow for having small breasts, Chifusa gives her the opportunity to cut hers, but she cannot bring herself to do so because of her sister's unselfishness and because of the sheer beauty of her breasts. After the fountain is completed, Kagefusa returns the scroll and bids farewell after making Chifusa promise to return her breasts to her after she masters the Breast Flow technique.
7	"The Boob Thief" "Oppai Kozō" (おっぱい小僧)	August 22, 2011
Chifusa and Kaede stop at a village so Chifusa can get a massage to ease the pain caused by her heavy tits. The masseus, a girl named Momoha, tells them of "The Boobie Kid" a local thief that steal's rich women's tits and allegedly gives them to the poor. Suspecting that this Boobie Kid might be a Manyu who knows how to master the Breast Flow technique, Chifusa takes a job as a bodyguard for a local big-breasted woman who will likely be the next target in order to catch the Boobie Kid. At the same time, the big-breasted landlady also employs another girl called Ouka as a bodyguard and immediately Chifusa becomes suspicious of Ouka because of her unusually good swordsmanship. That night, the Boobie Kid strikes but is chased away and caught by Chifusa. The Boobie Kid is later revealed to be Momoha, the masseus, and that she is a member of the Munamori family and that she knows a technique similar to the Breast Flow technique that Chifusa cannot use. At that point, Ouka arrives and reveals herself to be a Manyu assassin; she proceeds to attack Chifusa and nearly kills her but fails due to Momoha's interruption. While fleeing, Momoha is fatally wounded and as she lays dying gives Chifusa her tits so she can use their essence to master both the Manyu and Munamori techniques before bidding her farewell and wishing her good luck on her mission.
8	"Chifusa is Captured" "Chifusa Towaru" (千房囚わる)	August 29, 2011
Chifusa and Kaede run into Lord Hatomune Mie, who has escaped from his palace and disguised himself as a commoner to live a simple life in a village, where he has become a popular citizen. After receiving a tour of the town from Mie, Chifusa and Kaede depart but are soon stopped by a Manyu swordsman who attacks them and kidnaps Chifusa, taking her to the palace of a local lord. In the palace, the Manyu swordsman takes the Manyu scroll from Chifusa and begins to use the different techniques on her to test them out before returning her to the Manyu. Kaede asks Mie for help in rescuing Chifusa and the two break into the local lord's mansion, where Mie defeats dozens of the lord's soldiers and finally releases Chifusa from the dungeon where she is locked away. While Mie finishes off the local lord, Chifusa confronts the Manyu swordsman and kills him. After all three of them escape to safety, Chifusa rewards Mie by allowing him to play with her breasts, which Mie surprisingly refuses.
9	"The Love of a Flower Bud" "Tsubomi no Koi" (つぼみの恋)	September 5, 2011
While traveling through the forest, Kaede and Chifusa save a painter called Sakuji Itamune from a trio of Manyu guards who wanted to kill him because of the content of his art. When Sakuji sees Kaede, he immediately asks her to model for his next painting. When Chifusa tells Kaede she should not because it would slow down their progress, Kaede mistakes Chifusa's motivation and believes she does not want her to model because she is jealous, prompting her to abandon Chifusa. When they are about to start painting, Sakuji reveals he is a nude painter who only paints flat-chested models (which is why the three Manyu guards had attacked him) which shocks Kaede and makes her escape; though as soon as she leaves she is attacked by the three Manyu guards whom they had run into earlier. Sakuji finds them and tries to defend Kaede but is unable to beat the guards. The two are saved, however, when Chifusa arrives and easily defeats the attacking Manyu. Afterwards, with Chifusa's help, Sakuji makes a painting of Kaede which he considers his masterpiece. Sakuji offers Kaede to stay with him and be his permanent model, but Kaede chooses to stay with Chifusa and the two depart to continue their journey.
10	"The Breast Severing of the Beginning" "Hajimari no Chichi-giri" (始まりの乳斬り)	September 12, 2011
Chifusa and Kaede rest for the night in an abandoned shack after Chifusa comes down with a fever. While they are resting, Kaede mentions that Chifusa had only come down with a fever like that eight years prior (in an incident she does not recall which ended with Kaede being assigned as Chifusa's attendant). Chifusa begins to recall what happened what day while at the same time, in Muneyuki's house, Ouka does the same. It turns out that Chifusa had accidentally used the Breast Flow technique before during a duel she had with Ouka eight years prior and had accidentally stolen her breasts. After recovering, Kaede and Chifusa continue their journey, concluding that Chifusa has yet another set of breasts to return after she masters the Breast Flow technique.
11	"The Munamori Village" "Munemori no Sato" (胸杜の里)	September 19, 2011
Chifusa and Kaede arrive to the Munemori village, hometown to Chifusa's mother, which is now in ruin. There they reunite with Chifusa's grandmother and Chifusa's aunt, Tsuhuya Munemori, and her baby daughter, Hazuki. Tsuhuya agrees to teach Chifusa how to master the Breast Flow technique. At the same time, Kagefusa and Kokage take Ouka to Edo village, where they have a day of fun and a night of drinking, during which Kagefusa and Ouka discuss the latter's feelings for Muneyuki until they are interrupted by a courier with urgent news. The following day, before the training begins, Chifusa's grandmother tells Chifusa the story of how her mother died, revealing that Chifusa's mother killed herself so the Manyu would not learn how to use the Breast Flow technique for their corrupt ways. Nonetheless, Chifusa vows to learn the Breast Flow technique in order to undo the Manyu's unjust regime. As training begins, Chifusa realizes she cannot use the Breast Flow technique because she lacks a mother's heart, which is necessary for it. However, Tsuhuya tells Chifusa there is something she can do to attain a mother's heart without being a mother. Later, Kaede bursts in to warn Chifusa that a battalion of Manyu warriors has arrived to the village; a battalion led by Muneyuki and a vengeful Ouka.
12	"Breast Flowing" "Chichi-nagare" (乳流れ)	September 26, 2011
Muneyuki and Ouka lead a battalion of four Manyu assassins to capture Chifusa and Kaede. The two, along with Tsuhuya Munemori, face off against the assassins, defeating one of them before being outmatched. However, they are saved by the timely arrival of Kagefusa and Kokage, who join in on the fight. When the fight begins to get too rough, Chifusa's grandmother tells her to take Hazuki away with her to protect the last child of the Munemori bloodline; though initially hesitant, Chifusa and Kaede agree and flee with Hazuki. However, they are cornered by Ouka, who wishes to settle her old score with Chifusa as well as defeat her to gain status among the Manyu. Ouka initially has the upper hand in the fight, but halfway through it, Chifusa manages to unlock the Breast Flow by remembering how she had earlier attained a mother's heart by breastfeeding Hazuki, which allowed her to have a motherly bond with one of her kin. Chifusa uses the Breast Flow technique against Ouka and manages to make her breasts grow, which weakens her long enough for her and Kaede to flee with Hazuki. Later on, Chifusa and Kaede find Kagefusa, Kokage, Tsuhuya and Chifusa's grandmother, who defeated the assassins and fled as well. After returning Hazuki to Tsuhuya and reassuring Kagefusa that she will return her breasts, Chifusa and Kaede continue their journey.
OVA–1	"Kaede's Chifusa-sama Breast Growth Record 1" "Kaede no Chifusa-sama chibusa no seichō kiroku 1" (楓の乳房の成長記録)	October 4, 2011
While Chifusa sleeps at an inn, Kaede decides to measure her breasts but gets carried away and begins to play bondage with her sleeping friend. When Chifusa awakens, she finds herself trapped at her breast-crazed friend's mercy, who begins to play wildly with her boobs.
OVA–2	"Forging Beautiful Breasts 1" "Binyū tanzō 1" (美乳鍛造)	October 4, 2011
Kaede performs the Chichi-togi (Breast Polishing) cleansing on Chifusa's breasts to keep them from sagging after they become increasingly large due to her defeating Manyū Assassins. However, on this occasion, Kaede tries a new form of Chichi-togi that she thinks will also enlarge her breasts; the boob-on-boob Chichi-togi.
OVA–3	"Kaede's Play Time 1" "Kaede no saisei jikan 1" (楓の再生時間)	November 2, 2011
Kaede and Chifusa try different techniques from the Manyū Secret Scroll to try and enlarge Kaede's breasts. After several failed techniques, Kaede stumbles upon one she likes, which involves sucking milk out of a larger breasted woman's bosom. Chifusa attempts to protect her chest, but eventually gets pinned down by Kaede, who begins to suckle greedily on her chest for the whole afternoon.
OVA–4	"Kaede's Chifusa-sama Breast Growth Record 2" "Kaede no Chifusa-sama chibusa no seichō kiroku 2" (楓の乳房の成長記録)	November 2, 2011
After Chifusa's breasts expand too much, Chifusa's clothes stop fitting her and in order to make new ones, Kaede has to make a plaster model of her friend's breasts.
OVA–5	"Kaede's Chifusa-sama Breast Growth Record 3" "Kaede no Chifusa-sama chibusa no seichō kiroku 3" (楓の乳房の成長記録)	December 2, 2011
Kaede narrates through her journal a whole day of activity during her and Chifusa's travels; which includes descriptions of how they fled from Manyū Assassins through a forest, by swimming across a lake and finally confronting them and fighting them in a valley at sundown. However, Kaede's descriptions tend to quickly become drabbles about Chifusa's breasts rather than her actions.
OVA–6	"Forging Beautiful Breasts 2" "Binyū tanzō 2" (美乳鍛造)	December 2, 2011
Kagefusa forces Ouka to perform the Chichi-togi on her breasts and recurringly teases her with her bosom. When Kagefusa begins to lactate due to Ouka stimulating her nipples, she tries to spray her milk on Ouka telling her it will enlarge the size of her own chest if she drinks it. However, at this point, it is revealed that the entire sequence was just a nightmare that Ouka had.
OVA–7	"Kaede's Play Time 2" "Kaede no saisei jikan 2" (楓の再生時間)	January 7, 2012
Thinking that Kaede is out shopping at the market, Chifusa takes a bath in a steam room and performs a Chichi-togi on herself. However, a very pleased Kaede arrives and spies on Chifusa's alone time.
OVA–8	"Forging Beautiful Breasts 3" "Binyū tanzō 3" (美乳鍛造)	January 7, 2012
After recovering her breasts, Ouka goes to a hot spring to relax and play with her newly found bosom. However, she gets caught by Kagefusa and Kaede, who blackmail her into capturing Chifusa and hold her in place so that Kaede and Kagefusa can suckle on her breasts in an attempt to suckle her milk which, according to the Manyū Scroll, would enlarge their own breasts.

== See also ==
- Bakunyū, a genre of pornographic anime and manga depicting women with large breasts
