= Hoods Entertainment =

Japanese animation studio

Hoods Entertainment Inc.
- Native name: フッズエンタテインメント株式会社
- Romanized name: Kabushiki-gaisha Fuzzu Entateimento
- Type: Kabushiki gaisha
- Industry: Japanese animation
- Founded: February 2009; 17 years ago
- Founder: Osamu Nagai
- Successor: Staple Entertainment
- Headquarters: Suginami, Tokyo, Japan
- Key people: Osamu Nagai (CEO)
- Products: Aki Sora; The Qwaser of Stigmata; Mysterious Girlfriend X Drifters
- Number of employees: 4 (as of 2017)
- Website: www.hoods.co.jp

Hoods Entertainment Inc. (Japanese: フッズエンタテインメント株式会社, Hepburn: Kabushiki-gaisha Fuzzu Entateinmento) is a Japanese animation studio that was established in February 2009.

== History ==
The studio was founded in 2009 by former Gonzo producer Osamu Nagai, who acts as the company's representative director.

The studio has not been credited in an anime since 2021 which indicates that the studio may be inactive or defunct. Shinya Ueda, an animation producer with the studio from 2014 to 2020, left and took former Hoods staff members (such as production manager and director Ryou Nakamura) to his new studio Staple Entertainment. However, freelance animator Kiyoshi Tateishi, a common collaborator of Hoods Entertainment, lists on his Facebook page his freelancing work experience as "Hoods Entertainment (Staple Entertainment)" after working on Staple Entertainment's first production (Vermeil in Gold); furthermore, Staple Entertainment's studio address is the same as Hoods Entertainment's headquarters, indicating that Hoods Entertainment may be defunct with Staple Entertainment taking over.

== Works ==
=== Television series ===
Year	Title	Director(s)	Animation producer(s)	Source	Eps.	Refs.
2010	The Qwaser of Stigmata	Hiraku Kaneko	Producer: Osamu Nagai	Manga	24	
2011	The Qwaser of Stigmata II	Hiraku Kaneko	Producer: Osamu Nagai	Manga	12	
2011	Manyū Hiken-chō	Hiraku Kaneko		Manga	12	
2012	Mysterious Girlfriend X	Ayumu Watanabe	Producer: Osamu Nagai	Manga	12	
2013	Fantasista Doll (Note: Project generalization (プロジェクト統括) by Amber Film Works and Juumonji. Hoods Entertainment's Osamu Nagai served as "production producer" (制作プロデューサー), while Amber Film Works and Juumonji presidents Kazuhiko Ikeguchi and Yuuji Hori (respectively) are credited as "animation producers" (アニメーションプロデューサー).)	Hisashi Saitou	Kazuhiko Ikeguchi; Yuuji Hori; Osamu Nagai	Original work	12	
2013	BlazBlue Alter Memory (co-producued with teamKG)	Hideki Tachibana	Osamu Nagai; Takao Asaga	Video game	12	
2014	If Her Flag Breaks	Ayumu Watanabe		Light novel	12	
2014	A Good Librarian Like a Good Shepherd (co-animated with Felix Film)	Team Nico (Note: A team consisting of directors Kaori Hayashi, Tomomi Kamiya, Kenichi Konishi, Yuu Nobuta, and Mami Sodeyama)	Shinya Ueda; Tomohito Naka	Light novel	12	
2016	Drifters (as Hoods Drifters Studio)	Kenichi Suzuki	Shinya Ueda	Manga	12	
2018–2019	Märchen Mädchen	Hisashi Saitou (chief); Shigeru Ueda; Takuo Kimura (11–12)	Osamu Nagai; Masanobu Arakawa (7–10)	Light novel	12	
2018–2019	Real Girl	Takashi Naoya	Shinya Ueda	Manga	24	
2019	Val × Love	Takashi Naoya	Shinya Ueda	Manga	12	
2021	Gekidol	Shigeru Ueda	Osamu Nagai	Multi-media project	12	

=== OVA/ONAs ===
Year	Title	Director(s)	Animation producer(s)	Source	Eps.	Refs.
2009	Aki Sora	Takeo Takahashi	Producer: Osamu Nagai	Manga	1	
2010	Aki Sora ~Yume no Naka~	Takeo Takahashi	Osamu Nagai	Manga	2	
2010	The Qwaser of Stigmata: Portrait of the Empress	Hiraku Kaneko	Producer: Osamu Nagai	Manga	1	
2012	Mysterious Girlfriend X	Ayumu Watanabe	Producer: Osamu Nagai	Manga	1	
2012	Hori-san to Miyamura-kun (episodes 1–2)	Shingo Natsume (1); Erkin Kawabata (2)	Producer: Osamu Nagai	Manga	2	
2013	Kagaku Na Yatsura	Hiraku Kaneko	Producer: Osamu Nagai	Manga	1	
2013	Rescue Me!	Keiichiro Kawaguchi	Producer: Osamu Nagai	Manga	1	
2013	Ark IX	Keiichiro Kawaguchi	Osamu Nagai	Manga	1	
2013–2014	Vanquished Queens	Shin Itagaki	Osamu Nagai; Kazuaki Morijiri	Multi-media project	4	
2014	If Her Flag Breaks	Ayumu Watanabe		Light novel	1	
2014–2015	A Good Librarian Like a Good Shepherd (co-animated with Felix Film)	Team Nico		Light novel	6	
2015	Senran Kagura: Estival Versus- Shōjo-tachi no Sentaku	Shigeru Ueda	Osamu Nagai	Video game	1	
2015–2016	Hantsu × Trash	Hisashi Saitou	Osamu Nagai	Manga	3	
2016	Drifters: Special Edition (as Hoods Drifters Studio)	Kenichi Suzuki	Shinya Ueda	Manga	1	
2017–2018	Drifters (as Hoods Drifters Studio)	Kenichi Suzuki (1–2); Hitomi Ezoe (3)	Shinya Ueda	Manga	3	
2021	Alice in Deadly School	Shigeyasu Yamauchi		Multi-media project	1	

== Notable staff ==
=== Representative staff ===
- Osamu Nagai (founder and president)

=== Animation producers ===
- Shinya Ueda (2014~2020, founder of Staple Entertainment)
