= Yume Tsukai =

Japanese manga series

- First tankōbon volume cover, featuring Touko Mishima

夢使い
- Genre: Fantasy; Supernatural
- Manga
- Written by: Riichi Ueshiba
- Published by: Kodansha
- Imprint: Afternoon KC
- Magazine: Monthly Afternoon
- Original run: January 24, 2001 – December 25, 2003
- Volumes: 6
- Anime television series
- Directed by: Kazuo Yamazaki; Kenichi Ishikura (assistant)
- Produced by: Tatsuya Ishiguro
- Written by: Yasuko Kobayashi
- Music by: Tamiya Terashima
- Studio: Madhouse, Inc.
- Original network: TVK, TV Saitama, TV Asahi, Chiba TV, Tokyo MX
- Original run: April 9, 2006 – June 25, 2006
- Episodes: 12
- icon

Yume Tsukai (Japanese: 夢使い; lit. 'Dream Users') is a Japanese manga series written and illustrated by Riichi Ueshiba. It was serialized in Kodansha's seinen manga magazine Monthly Afternoon from January 2001 to December 2003, and is a spin-off of Ueshiba's earlier manga series, Discommunication.

Yume Tsukai was adapted into an anime television series produced by Pony Canyon and Madhouse. It was broadcast from April to June 2006.

== Plot ==
The series revolves around "dream masters" (夢使い, yume tsukai) who turn nightmares into peaceful dreams. On behalf of their clients they go around searching for nightmares which have escaped the mind of the owner and have manifested themselves into the real world, causing havoc. The nightmares are a paranormal phenomenon which have the appearance of poltergeist activity. The dream masters' goal is to defeat the nightmares, and returning them to their respective owners as pacified dreams. However, the dream masters do not interfere with an owner's life, and the owner is left to deal with the source of the nightmare. The show is characterized by haunting music, strange ghost like nightmares and the transformation of children's toys known as "play offerings" into weaponry and monsters.

Unlike the anime, the manga goes more in-depth with the cases; for example, the first case takes up the entire first three volumes. They do not just pacify nightmares and expel them from the real world, but instead they take all sorts of cases, where no dreaming is involved, but their power is required.

== Characters ==
Touko Mishima (三島 塔子, Mishima Tōko) - Nichiyousei Yume Tsukai (Sunday Star)
Voiced by: Ayako Kawasumi
Known as the warabe yuusai (童遊斎), seventeen-year-old Touko is the leader of the Yume Tsukai. As Rinko's older sister, she took over their father's practice after he was killed during a battle. Somewhat anemic, she spends most of her time sleeping in the odd toy shop where they are based from. Because she mostly stays at the shop and wears an overall skirt and geta, Rinko dubs her as a hermit and wishes her sister would get out more. Touko wears her father's kitsune noh mask, and doesn't go anywhere without it. She even bathes and sleeps with it. Because of her powers to see into other people's dreams, Touko's left eye serves as a window in which her clients can see their dreams through, because of this she can only cry in her right eye.
Rinko Mishima (三島 燐子, Mishima Rinko) - Kayousei Yume Tsukai (Tuesday Star)
Voiced by: Kei Shindō
At 10 years old, Rinko is the youngest member of the Yume Tsukai. Unlike her sister, Rinko is more active and gung-ho and is always ready for action. Smart, yet impatient, she is usually the first to act when it comes to seeking out the nightmares that pop up. She claims to be a Super Elementary School Student.
Hajime Tachibana (橘 一, Tachibana Hajime) - Kinyousei Yume Tsukai (Friday Star)
Voiced by: Tomokazu Seki
Aloof, eclectic, and somewhat having a lolita complex (perhaps in jest), Hajime is the oldest of the Yume Tsukai. Having a flair for the dramatics, he battles nightmares in alongside Touko and Rinko. In the manga, his lolita complex is for certain, but that goes more along with the much more adult tone of the manga.
Satoka Sagawa (茶川 三時花, Sagawa Satoka) - Doyousei Yume Tsukai (Saturday Star)
Voiced by: Mamiko Noto
Shy and timid Satoka joined the Yume Tsukai after her boyfriend, Satoru, another Yume Tsukai, was killed. She still carries the burden of his death, but later on finds the strength to carry on the title of Doyousei. Satoka lives in Nagasaki, on the southern island of Kyūshū. She is very well off, having a limo, butler, and a private jet, but states she's not that rich. She wears Satoru's hat and seems to always be with her. Unlike Touko's mask, she takes it off when needed. Satoka is still new to the Yume Tsukai, so she is receiving lessons from Rinko, who blasts at her to call her senpai.
Misako Mishima (三島 美砂子, Mishima Misako)
Voiced by: Aya Hisakawa
Aunt to the sisters from their father's side, Misako is the 29-year-old virgin that unseals the Dream Cyclone weapon for the Yume Tsukai. She spends time at the family house where the Dream Cyclone shrine resides, waiting for the call to arms when the team is out on a job. Misako is very up-to-date with technology, but limits herself to her cellphone and computer. Being very sensitive about her age, she makes a point to let everyone know she's 29, and not 30.

== Media ==
=== Manga ===
Written and illustrated by Riichi Ueshiba, Yume Tsukai was serialized in Kodansha's seinen manga magazine Monthly Afternoon from January 24, 2001, to December 25, 2003. Kodansha collected its chapters in six tankōbon volumes, released from June 22, 2001, to February 23, 2004.

==== Volumes ====
| No. | Release date | ISBN |
|---|---|---|
| 1 | June 22, 2001 | 978-4-06-321123-8 |
| 2 | January 23, 2002 | 978-4-06-321132-0 |
| 3 | August 23, 2002 | 978-4-06-321140-5 |
| 4 | February 21, 2003 | 978-4-06-321146-7 |
| 5 | August 22, 2003 | 978-4-06-321152-8 |
| 6 | February 23, 2004 | 978-4-06-321156-6 |

=== Anime ===
A 12-episode anime adaptation was produced by Pony Canyon and animated by Madhouse. It first aired on Television Kanagawa from April 9 to June 25, 2006. (Note: Yume Tsukai aired on Television Kanagawa on Saturday 26:30, effectively Sunday at 2:30 a.m. JST.) It was directed by Kazuo Yamazaki with Kenichi Ishikura as assistant director, written by Yasuko Kobayashi, and composed by Tamiya Terashima. Shuichi Shimamura was the character designer, and Kiyotaka Nakahara was the guest character designer.

The series' opening theme is "Yume Meikyuu: Hikari to Yami no Dance" (夢迷宮～光と闇のダンス～), performed by Yoko. The series' ending theme is "Kodō" (鼓動), performed by Ayako Kawasumi and Kei Shindō as their anime characters.
