= Riichi Ueshiba =

Japanese manga artist

Ueshiba Riichi
- Born: September 4, 1969 (age 57); Fukuoka Prefecture, Japan
- Occupation: Manga artist

Riichi Ueshiba (植芝 理一, Ueshiba Riichi; a.k.a. Reach Ueshiba) is a Japanese manga artist. He has written and illustrated Yume Tsukai and Mysterious Girlfriend X, both of which were adapted into anime series. Another of his works, Discommunication, had its main characters animated in the 14th OVA episode of Mysterious Girlfriend X as a cameo appearance.

Mysterious Girlfriend X is licensed in North America by Vertical. Discommunication has been licensed by J-Novel Club and is being released in English digitally.

== Works ==
- Discommunication (ディスコミュニケーション) (1991–1999, serialized in Monthly Afternoon, Kodansha)
- Discommunication: Gakuenhen (ディスコミュニケーション 学園編) (1996–1997, serialized in Monthly Afternoon, Kodansha)
- Discommunication: Seireihen (ディスコミュニケーション 精霊編) (1999–2000, serialized in Monthly Afternoon, Kodansha)
- Yume Tsukai (夢使い, Dream Users) (2001–2003, serialized in Monthly Afternoon, Kodansha)
- Nazo no Kanojo X (謎の彼女X, Mysterious Girlfriend X) (2004–2014, serialized in Monthly Afternoon, Kodansha)
- Ookumochan Furasshubakku (大蜘蛛ちゃんフラッシュ・バック, Ookumo-chan Flashback) (2017–2020, serialized in Monthly Afternoon, Kodansha)
