= The Legend of Hei II =

2025 animated action adventure film

- Theatrical release poster
- Chinese: 罗小黑战记2
- Directed by: MTJJ; Gu Jie
- Screenplay by: MTJJ; Gu Jie; Fengxishenlei; Kexin Peng
- Based on: The Legend of Luo Xiaohei by MTJJ
- Produced by: Cong Fangbing; Cao Zijian
- Starring: Shan Xin; Liu Mingyue; Zhu Jing; Luan Lisheng; Fu Chenyang; Yan Ling
- Cinematography: Liang Shuang
- Music by: Sun Yujing
- Production company: HMCH
- Distributed by: Qianwanjian Media
- Release date: July 18, 2025
- Running time: 120 minutes
- Country: China
- Language: Mandarin
- Box office: US$75.5 million

The Legend of Hei II (simplified Chinese: 罗小黑战记2; traditional Chinese: 羅小黑戰記2; pinyin: Luóxiǎohēizhànjì2) is a 2025 Chinese animated action adventure film written and directed by MTJJ and Gu Jie. It was released in theaters across China on July 18, 2025. The film is the sequel to The Legend of Hei (2019).

== Synopsis ==
The story takes place before the animated series and after the first movie. Following an attack on the Spirit World, the peace between the yaojing and humans is shattered. Evidence points to Wuxian, putting the master and apprentice in danger. Xiaohei and his senior fellow apprentice, Luye, embark on an adventurous journey to uncover the truth, attempting to uncover the hidden hand behind the attack and prevent the outbreak of war between humans and spirits.

== Plot ==
A powerful yaojing named Master Dasong and the members of his Liushui Guild Hall were ambushed by human soldiers armed with advanced weaponry strong enough to kill several yaojing. While fending off the mercenaries, Master Dasong was confronted by someone he knew before he was promptly slain.

Two years have passed since the events of the previous movie. Xiaohei still lives with Wuxian, honing his skills in metal manipulation, relearning his ability over Domain after losing it, studying Mandarin, and enjoying travels with Wuxian. One day, Wuxian receives a summons to the Main Hall to see the elders of Yaojing Guild. On the way to the building, they are joined by Luye, yaojing and a former student of Wuxian. At the meeting, the elders question Wuxian about the attack on Liushui Guild Hall and his whereabouts. They have found evidence of bullets infused with Roumo-wood, a rare type of iron-hard wood imbued with spiritual energy which recently went missing from the Guild's watch, along with the wood stolen from Liushui Guild Hall. They also found security footage showing someone who looks like Wuxian leading the attack. With the given evidence, the impossible strength required to defeat Master Dasong, and racial tensions between the Yaojing and the humans rise, suspicion falls on Wuxian. Wuxian denies the attack but is unable to prove it, but also theorizes that the true culprit's motive could be to place suspicion on the strongest Enforcer in the guild to weaken their total forces. So Wuxian suggests that he be placed under watch by NeZha in the Main Hall since he is the only one to match his strength, while the rest of the guild investigates and finds the real culprit.

Luye and Xiaohei investigate on their own, but must be supervised by two members of the guild due to their relation to Wuxian, two bat yaojings named Jia and Yi. However, Luye manages to shake them off by teleporting to random locations before destroying the teleporter to the Dongqiao Guild Hall. Luye can detect residue of spiritual energy, where she sensed a trail of spiritual energy left by the Roumu-wood from Liushui Guild Hall. Following the trail, a yaojing named Nihuang attempts to ambush her. Giving chase, Xiaohei and Luye find out not only was Nihuang part of the attack on Liushui Guild Hall, but he also can shapeshift into other people, including Wuxian. They detain Nihuang and prepare to return to the Main Hall to clear Wuxian's name.

Meanwhile, Wuxian hangs out in NeZha's room within the Main Hall and plays video games with him all day, but suspicion on him rose due to Luye's actions to destroy a teleporter to evade guild supervision. The Guild investigation has yet to find the culprit, but it managed to locate a military base of the humans that attacked Liushui Guild Hall, along with some of Roumu-wood. Chinan, one of the guild elders, personally leads an attack on the military base to retrieve the wood.

Luye and Xiaohei struggle to return to the Main Hall since the teleporter Luye destroyed has not yet been repaired. They have no choice but to board a plane to arrive the next day. They are joined by the Jia and Yi on the plane. Mid-flight, they are ambushed by other yaojings attempting to free Nihuang. They succeed in rescuing him while destroying the plane in the process. Luye had no choice but to let them flee as she worked with Xiaohei, Jia, Yi, and the human pilots to safely crash the plane in the nearby mountains. Jia and Yi have become too injured to follow Luye anymore, while she goes to pursue the culprits again. Xiaohei realizes that Luye's actions to destroy the teleporter and book a flight were all to bait the culprits into attacking the plane to rescue Nihuang so that she could more easily track them. Xiaohei berates Luye for her unethical methods of putting the humans in harm's way, but she views the humans with very little regard. She is more focused on trying to single-handedly bring down the leader who organized the attack on Liushui Guild Hall.

Meanwhile, the investigation into the attacked military base has revealed the location of a second military base holding the rest of the missing Roumu-wood. A few members of the guild arrived there first to construct a teleporter in the nearby mountains so that the entirety of the Yaojing Guild could launch a full-scale attack. However, they are shortly discovered and have to construct the teleporter while surviving an onslaught of human bombings. Wuxian overhears all the yaojing Enforcers gathering outside the Great Hall teleporter to prepare for the attack. Despite how risky and suspicious it is, Wuxian wants to take part in the attack to single-handedly storm the military base to prevent yaojing casualties. Chinan refuses Wuxian's plan, so Wuxian forcibly stops all the Enforcers from passing through the newly connected teleporter. None of the Enforcers, Chinan included, can defeat Wuxian nor enter the teleporter, so NeZha has no choice but to step in. The battle between Wuxian and NeZha escalated to the point where their fight was causing damage to the teleporter, so Chinan reluctantly gives Wuxian permission to participate.

Luye eventually tracks Nihuang and his crew to an abandoned steel mill. Despite the abundance of metal being her favor as a metal-elementalist like Wuxian and Xiaohei, the culprits have set up a magic formation around the entire steel mill that prevents her from using her metal powers. While fending them off with kung-fu alone to destroy the different points of the magic formation, she is attacked by Lord Lingyao, one of the elders of the Yaojing Guild. While wielding Dasong's Liushi Armor, Lingyao reveals himself to be the true mastermind behind the attack on Liushui Guild Hall, the stolen Roumu-wood, and equipping foreign mercenaries with anti-yaojing weaponry. Lingyao fears that the Guild's complacency and integration with the rapidly evolving human technology will eventually lead to humans surpassing yaojing in strength, leading either to their extinction or subjugation. He wanted to frame Wuxian, since he is the only human Enforcer, but also stronger than most of the other Enforcers in the guild. By advancing human weaponry and attacking yaojings, Lingyao was hoping to escalate human and yaojing racial tension to the point where yaojings would approve of the destruction of human civilization. At the last minute, Xiaohei swoops in to help Luye. Realizing the situation, Xiaohei uses his unpolished Space manipulation powers to help Luye destroy the rest of the formation. Despite Luye being severely injured, they both managed to destroy the formation and amputate Lingyao. He concedes and surrenders willingly. The two are then caught in the blast of a magic seal that causes the mill to self-destruct. While they recover, Xiaohei confronts Luye on her principles, saying he will "side with the right side" should a war between the yaojings and humans break out, while Luye is firm to side with the yaojings no matter what.

The Enforcers of the Yaojing Guild pass through the teleporter to assist the yaojing in constructing the teleporter as they try to survive human military strikes. Wuxian storms the military base alone while the other yaojings watch, and he effortlessly gets back the Roumu wood (although the human soldiers confuse him with Nezha due to his t-shirt).

Time passes, and Lingyao is now in custody at the Great Hall. The Guild elders Chinan and Headmaster Yudi confront Lingyao on his actions, and the whereabouts of the last missing piece of Roumu wood not found at either the military base. Lingyao refuses to reveal its location and uses its absence and its possible human possession as a stalemate to ensure the yaojing maintain peace with the humans. While the Guild elders do not accept Lingyao's principles, Lingyao points out the hypocrisy that the Elders kept his involvement and his crime a secret.

Wuxian, now cleared of wrongdoing, returns home with Xiaohei. Luye watched them be happy together and reflected on her childhood and her apprenticeship with Wuxian. Realizing that her past trauma with humans made her bitter and isolated from Wuxian, she is happy that Xiaohei can live a happy life. She parts with Wuxian, telling him to visit her sometime.

== Cast ==
Luo Xiaohei (羅小黑, Luó Xiǎohēi, Hei for short, lit. 'Little Black') Voiced by: Shan Xin (Mandarin); Kana Hanazawa (Japanese). Xiaohei is a cat yaojing with the power to manipulate metal and space, though he is better at the former due to his powers having been stolen. At best, he uses his Space manipulation to create portals, though he is terrible with accuracy when under duress. Besides his elemental manipulation, he also can transform into a small black cat, a giant beastly cat, and separate parts of his body into small black orbs. He is the current student of Wuxian. He is the main character of the original series on which the movie is based.

Wuxian (无限, Wúxiàn, lit. 'Infinity') Voiced by: Liu Mingyue (Mandarin); Mamoru Miyano (Japanese). He is an immortal human over 400 years old. He is skilled in Metal manipulation and a form of Space manipulation called Devour, which allows him to instantly destroy an amount of physical matter with which he comes into contact. Wuxian is one of the most powerful Enforcers at the Yaojing Guild, which terrifies many of the yaojings who discriminate against humans. While he is skilled in combat and magic, he is comedically terrible with directions and cooking.

Luye (鹿野) Voiced by: Zhu Jing (Mandarin). She is a yaojing that is nearly a hundred years old. She lost her original master and all her friends and family after her village was caught in the crossfire of a human war. Wuxian and the guild took her in, despite her reclusive behavior and animosity toward humans. Like Wuxian, she is a metal elementalist that can detect traces of magic in the air. Luye is equipped with various magic artifacts, one of which is a small orb that traps you from the inside, which looks similar to a Poké Ball.

Nezha (哪吒 Nézhā) Voiced by: Shan Xin (Mandarin). Based on the legend of the same name, he is a power yaojing and one of the founding members of the Yaojing Guild. He is the only person at the Guild besides the elders who is a match for Wuxian. Much like the mythos on which he is based, he can manipulate fire and use his rings as weapons, or to fly. Despite his overwhelming strength, he is incredibly lazy and spends most of his time playing video games.

Lingyao (灵遥) Voiced by: Luan Lisheng (Mandarin). He is one of the elders who runs the Yaojing Guild and the main antagonist. After failing to convince Master Dasong of his cause, he kills everyone in his guild and steals the Liushui Armor: a magic ability that allows one to create a shield out of light that can deflect bullets, along with transforming the light into objects such as swords. Lingyao was originally portrayed to be against the war between humans and yaojings, but he believes his effort to escalate the conflict will convince the rest of the yaojings to preemptively attack human society to prevent them from eventually advancing far enough where human technology and weaponry surpass yaojing magic.

Chinian (池年) Voiced by: Fu Chenyang (Mandarin). He is one of the elders who runs the Yaojing Guild. He was the first to point blame at Wuxian for the death of Master Dasong, claiming Wuxian holds innate allegiance to humanity simply for being human. Chinian is a powerful earth elementalist, capable of moving massive sections of dirt, stone, and concrete with ease.

- Jia (甲, lit. 'Placeholder Person A')

voiced by: Yan Ling (Mandarin)

- Yi (乙, lit. 'Placeholder Person B')

voiced by: Chen Qigang (Mandarin)

- Xi Muzi

voiced by: Huang Zhenji (Mandarin)

- Panjing

voiced by: Li Lu (Mandarin)

- Jiulao

voiced by: Chen Siyu (Mandarin)

- Zheng Xinyi

voiced by Ren Jingxing (Mandarin)

- Captain

voiced by: Ren Jingxing (Mandarin)

== Production ==
=== Script and setting ===
The Legend of Hei II was produced by the animation studio Hanmu Chunhua (HMCH). Kexin Peng, who also wrote the previous film, continued to serve as the screenwriter.

The Legend of Hei II's script took about a year and a half to write, starting in 2019. The film inherits and expands the worldview of the previous film, while also introducing new characters and conflicts. The writing process was designed with a balance between new and existing audiences in mind, and the worldview and character relationships were introduced in the opening.

Although the movie is set in a modern background, it also incorporates traditional Chinese culture. The film imaginatively depicts the integration of traditional Chinese spirits into modern society: Nezha enjoys playing video games, while spirits not only use public transportation but also become addicted to their smartphones. One of the two producers, Cao Zijian, mentioned that the clothing and settings in the work were refined through extensive research and on-site investigations to ensure authenticity, all in service of the overall style.

Character designs for Xiaohei, Wuxian, and Nezha continue from the previous film, with only new costumes and adjusted proportions for Xiaohei. Luye and the elders are new characters. Luye's design was the most difficult in the entire series, with the production team going through over 200 design drafts before finalizing her design. Luye and Xiaohei represent reality and ideals, respectively. Another producer, Cong Fangbing, explained that Luye's design was inspired by the spiritual dilemma of modern people: she appears cold and sometimes harsh, but she is also reserved and possesses a soft heart. As a war orphan, Luye, after enduring pain, ultimately chooses to accept Wuxian's help and emerge from the shadows of her past. She also possesses a strong spiritual core. The names of some supporting characters in the film are derived from the nicknames of the production staff.

The Legend of Hei II demonstrates an inclusive stance. It doesn't force moral principles, but rather respects everyone's perspective. Between the whitewashing of a never-to-come war and the brutality of a no-win situation after a war, the team, consisting of Xiaohei and Luye, chose to express the message that "we can maintain peace".

=== Animation production ===
The Legend of Hei II was produced using traditional 2D hand-drawn animation, with 3D modeling as an aid. The production cycle lasted six years, with the aircraft combat sequence taking a full year. According to the producers, more than 200,000 hand-drawn genga were used, and there were about 2,400 shots in total. Animation is typically produced using a "one-shot-two" technique (using 12 genga per second in 24p film), but most of the ten action scenes in the film were produced using a "one-shot-one" technique (using 24 genga per second in 24p film), to achieve a smoother and more fluid action.

The Legend of Hei II was created with special consideration for the action design of live-action films and real-world location shooting. For the airplane fighting scenes, an aircraft consultant was hired to show the fighting scenes in a real aircraft flying state. The Cangnan Guild Hall in the film was filmed in Cangnan County, Wenzhou, incorporating the city's elements and the Minnan dialect. The Hanmu Hall in the film is based on the production company's name. The Yuedong Guild Hall serves Cantonese-style morning tea. The "Lingkui Town" sign is a homophone of the local dialect for "Lingxi Town (Cangnan County)".

=== Dubbing ===
The voice cast for The Legend of Hei II remains the same as the original series. Huang Zhenji, who voiced Diting in the original animated series, is the voice director. To ensure Xiaohei's voice is unique, Shan Xin deliberately avoided using Xiaohei's voice when recording other anime characters. Zhu Jing, the voice actor for Luye, emphasized the need to create a sense of contrast in the voice acting to portray Luye's "stable and powerful exterior, yet soft heart." Liu Mingyue, the voice actor for Wuxian, stated that to portray Xiaohei's emotional bond with Wuxian, he chose to "create a sense of an old father."

== Release and response ==
The Legend of Hei II was released in mainland China on July 18, 2025, and was also scheduled to be released in Japan on November 7. In August 2025, it was announced that the film would be released in the United States and Canada theaters by GKIDS on September 5, 2025.

The Legend of Hei II has a Douban score of 8.7, making it the highest-scoring Chinese-language animated film in theaters as of 2025. China Central Television's entertainment review said that the film maintains and further enhances the series' consistent oriental fantasy. Through a more mature visual expression, the film elevates and integrates Chinese aesthetics with philosophical reflections. It also incorporates traditional Chinese cultural elements into its artistic conception and scenes, presenting them in an innovative way. Sanlian Lifeweek praised the film's action scenes, calling them "the pinnacle of domestic production", and noted that the political dynamics between the spirits and the human elite in the film possessed a realism not previously seen in the series. However, it also questioned the plot's conflict, arguing that the motivations behind the conflict between the spirits and humans were unexplained and merely glossed over as an introduction.

Caixin Media noted that the film's strength lies in its refusal to set the limits of right and wrong, and instead presents a comprehensive look at each character's perspectives and stances, each influenced by their diverse backgrounds, leaving the judgment to the audience. The film also explicitly hints at a more advanced anti-war narrative: "There are no survivors in war". The Qilu Evening News said that the film goes beyond the positioning of a commercial animation and explores heavy topics such as war, hatred, and trust with gentle yet firm power.
