= Kana Hanazawa =

Japanese voice actress (born 1989)

- 花澤 香菜
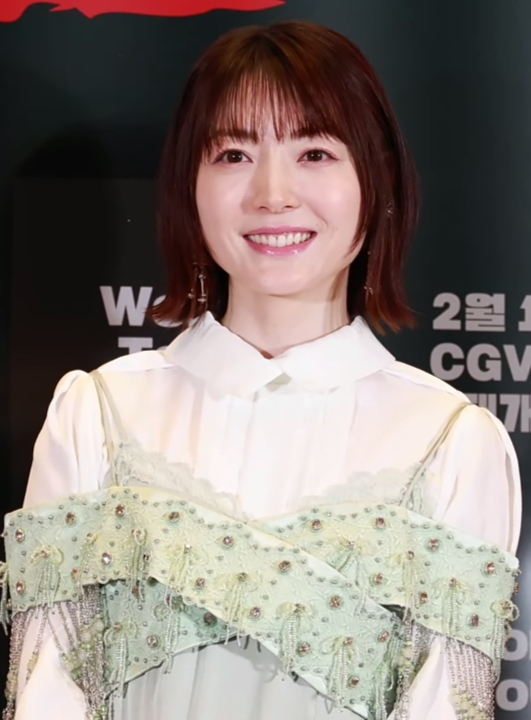
- Hanazawa in 2024
- Born: February 25, 1989 (age 37); Tokyo, Japan
- Occupations: Actress; voice actress; singer
- Years active: 1990–present
- Agent: Office Osawa
- Spouse: Kensho Ono (m. 2020; div. 2025)
- Musical career
- Genres: J-pop; Anison
- Instrument: Vocals
- Years active: 2012–present
- Labels: Aniplex (2012–2017); Sacra Music (2017–2021); Pony Canyon (2021–present)
- Website: hanazawa-kana.com

Kana Hanazawa (花澤 香菜, Hanazawa Kana; born February 25, 1989) is a Japanese actress and singer. A prolific performer in anime, she has amassed several film and television credits since her debut in 2003. She won the Seiyu Award for Best Supporting Actress in 2015, and won the Newtype Anime Awards for Best Voice Actress three times in 2015, 2017 and 2018.

Her debut single, "Hoshizora Destination" (星空☆ディスティネーション), was released on April 25, 2012, under the Aniplex/Sony Music Entertainment Japan label.

== Career ==
Hanazawa began acting when she was in kindergarten. She made regular appearances at the live-action variety program Yappari Sanma Daisensei.

She made her voice acting debut as Holly in Last Exile. She played Ryoko Kaminagi in Zegapain. She signed up with the voice acting agency Office Osawa.

Hanazawa went to university in 2007, at the same time, she began to make her mark as a voice actress. She voiced the title character in Kobato., Suou in Darker than Black: Gemini of the Meteor, Nadeko Sengoku in Bakemonogatari, Angel / Kanade Tachibana in Angel Beats, and Anri Sonohara in Durarara!!. She was voted in 2010 as "Best Female Voice Actress" by listeners of the radio program Nonko and Nobita's Anime Scramble (ノン子とのび太のアニメスクランブル). She graduated from university in 2011, and in the same year became a full-time voice actress. In late 2010, she was invited to the Anime Festival Asia anime convention in Singapore.

As a child, Hanazawa often sang idol songs and was a fan of Hello! Project, particularly of Miki Fujimoto. While voice acting for Bakemonogatari, Hanazawa performed the song "Renai Circulation", one of the series' opening theme songs and the image song for her character, Nadeko Sengoku. The success of the song later led to Hanazawa receiving more offers to perform character songs and, eventually, a singing career.

On February 23, 2012, it was announced that Hanazawa would launch her official website. A few days later, during the "Kana Hanazawa Solo Debut Presentation Party event", it was announced that she would release four singles within a year: "Hoshizora Destination" (星空☆ディスティネーション) released on April 25, "Hatsukoi no Oto" (初恋ノオト), released on July 18, "Happy Endings", released on October 24 and was used as ending theme for anime Zetsuen no Tempest, and "Silent Snow", released on January 16, 2013. Her first album Claire was released on February 20, 2013, and her second album 25 was released on February 26, 2014. She released an album title Blue Avenue in April 2015, and went on a concert tour starting at the Nippon Budokan on May 3. The Blu-ray release of the show, Live Avenue Kana Hanazawa in Budokan, ranked number six in sales.

Hanazawa won Best Supporting Actress at the 9th Seiyu Awards. She later won Newtype's Best Voice Actress award. Hanazawa starred in her first live-action feature film Kimi ga Inakucha Dame Nanda (君がいなくちゃだめなんだ, It's Definitely No Good You're Not Here). Her video would later place tenth in Oricon's Blu-ray Disc Chart. Hanazawa moved to the Sacra Music record label under Sony Music Entertainment Japan in April 2017.

On July 1, 2021, Hanazawa transferred her record label to Pony Canyon. She released the album Tsuioku to Yubisaki (追憶と指先) on April 10, 2024.

== Personal life ==
In February 2017, during a live stream promoting the release of Opportunity, Hanazawa confirmed she and Kensho Ono were dating, after Shūkan Bunshun published allegations about their relationship. On July 8, 2020, they announced that they got married.

On September 14, 2025, Hanazawa and Ono announced their divorce on their social media accounts, citing different lifestyles and being unable to spend time together as their reasons.

== Filmography ==
=== Animation ===
List of voice performances in animation
Year	Title	Role	Notes	Ref.
2003	Last Exile	Holly Mad-thane		
2006	Zegapain	Ryoko Kaminagi		
2007	Getsumento Heiki Mina	Nakoru Hazemi / Mina Minazuki		
2007	Mushi-Uta	Shiika Anmoto		
2007	Potemayo	Potemayo		
2007	Higurashi When They Cry: Kai	Tomomi		
2007	Sketchbook ~ full color's ~	Sora Kajiwara		
2008	Gunslinger Girl: Il Teatrino	Angelica	Also OVA	
2008	To Love-Ru series	Mikan Yuuki	OVA and TV series, Motto, Darkness, Darkness 2nd	
2008	Blassreiter	Elea		
2008	Kyōran Kazoku Nikki	Yūka Midarezaki		
2008	Someday's Dreamers: Summer Skies	Sora Suzuki		
2008	Sekirei series	Kusano	Also Pure Engagement	
2008	Strike Witches series	Amaki Suwa		
2008	Kannagi: Crazy Shrine Maidens	Zange		
2008	Kemeko Deluxe!	Rico		
2008	You're Under Arrest Full Throttle Season 3	Sakura Fujieda		
2009	Asu no Yoichi!	Kagome Ikaruga		
2009	Tower of Druaga: The Sword of Uruk	Henaro		
2009	Pandora Hearts	Sharon Rainsworth		
2009	Basquash!	Coco JD		
2009	Aoi Hana	Prince		
2009	Monogatari series	Nadeko Sengoku	Bake, Nise, Second Season, Owari, Koyomi, Zoku Owari, Off and Monster season	
2009	Sora no Manimani	Apricot Yukie		
2009	A Certain Scientific Railgun series	Erii Haruue	Also S	
2009	Kobato.	Kobato Hanato		
2009	Darker than Black: Gemini Meteor	Suou Pavlichenko		
2009	Yutori-chan	Shiori Tsumekomi		
2010	Ladies versus Butlers!	Ayse Khadim		
2010	Durarara!!	Anri Sonohara		
2010	The Qwaser of Stigmata series	Fumika Mitarai		
2010	B Gata H Kei	Mayu Miyano		
2010	Maid Sama!	Sakura Hanazono		
2010	Angel Beats!	Angel / Kanade Tachibana		
2010	Gokujō!! Mecha Mote Iinchō Second Collection	Mari Konaka		
2010	Amagami SS	Library committee of rumor		
2010	Occult Academy	Kozue Naruse		
2010	Asobi ni Iku yo! series	Aoi Futaba	Also OVA	
2010	Hen Semi	Nanako Matsutaka	OVA	
2010	Mayo Elle Otokonoko			
2010	Oreimo series	Ruri Gokō / Kuroneko, Hinata Gokō		
2010	The World God Only Knows series	Shiori Shiomiya		
2010	Otome Yōkai Zakuro	Susukihotaru		
2010	Princess Jellyfish	Tsukimi Kurashita		
2010	Megane na Kanojo	Chiaki Kuramoto		
2011	Infinite Stratos series	Charlotte Dunois	Also IS2	
2011	Freezing series	Rana Linchen	Also Vibrations	
2011	Fractale	Nessa		
2011	Moshidora	Yuki Miyata		
2011	Morita-san wa Mukuchi series	Mayu Morita	OVA and TV series	
2011	Dog Days series	Noir Vinocacao		
2011	Steins;Gate	Mayuri Shiina	Also Steins;Gate 0 in 2018	
2011	Denpa Onna to Seishun Otoko	Hanazawa-san		
2011	Sket Dance	Saaya Agata		
2011	Deadman Wonderland	Shiro		
2011	Blue Exorcist	Shiemi Moriyama		
2011	Ro-Kyu-Bu! series	Tomoka Minato	OVA and TV series, SS series	
2011	Kamisama Dolls	Mahiru Hyūga		
2011	The Idolmaster	Eri Mizutani	Full appearance on episode 10; multiple cameos	
2011	Mayo Chiki!	Kureha Sakamachi		
2011	The Mystic Archives of Dantalian	Young Hugh		
2011	Baby Princess 3D Paradise 0	Mizuki	OVA	
2011	Haganai series	Kobato Hasegawa	Also Next	
2011	Last Exile: Fam the Silver Wing	Alvis E. Hamilton		
2011	Guilty Crown	Ayase Shinomiya		
2011	Carnival Phantasm	Ayaka Sajō	OVA anime project Episode: Fate/Prototype	
2012	Bodacious Space Pirates	Chiaki Kurihara		
2012	Aquarion Evol	Zessica Wong	Also Love OVA in 2015	
2012	Inu × Boku SS	Karuta Roromiya		
2012	Danball Senki W	Ran Hanasaki		
2012	Black Rock Shooter	Black Rock Shooter, Mato Kuroi, Insane Black Rock Shooter		
2012	Zetman	Konoha Amagi		
2012	Sengoku Collection	Tokugawa Ieyasu		
2012	Shirokuma Cafe	Mei Mei		
2012	Saki	Kuro Matsumi	Achiga-hen episode of Side-A, The Nationals	
2012	Chōyaku Hyakunin isshu: Uta Koi	Touko princess		
2012	Binbougami ga!	Ichiko Sakura		
2012	Aesthetica of a Rogue Hero	Kuzuha Domoto		
2012	Campione!	Yuri Mariya		
2012	My Little Monster	Chizuru Oushima		
2012	From the New World	Maria Akizuki		
2012	Blast of Tempest	Aika Fuwa	Also theme song	
2012	Little Busters! series	Mutsumi Suginami	Also Refrain	
2012	Magi: The Labyrinth of Magic series	Ren Kougyoku	Also Kingdom	
2012	Teekyu series	Marimo Bando		
2012	Psycho-Pass series	Akane Tsunemori		
2013	Sasami-san@Ganbaranai	Kagami Yagami		
2013	Kotoura-san	Yuriko Mifune		
2013	Zettai Bōei Leviathan	Syrup		
2013	WataMote	Yuu Naruse		
2013	Coppelion	Aoi Fukasaku		
2013	Nagi-Asu: A Lull in the Sea	Manaka Mukaido		
2013	Wanna be the Strongest in the World	Juri Sanada		
2013	Unbreakable Machine-Doll	Hotaru		
2013	Tokyo Ravens	Natsume Tsuchimikado		
2013	Date A Live	Rinne Sonogami		
2013	Balala the Fairies	Michelle Lin		
2014	Buddy Complex	Nasu Mayuka		
2014	My Neighbor Seki	Rumi Yokoi	Also OAVs	
2014	Space Dandy	Adelie		
2014	D-Frag!	Roka Shibasaki		
2014	No-Rin	Minori Nakazawa		
2014	Wake Up, Girls!	Anna		
2014	Nisekoi series	Kosaki Onodera	Also Nisekoi:	
2014	Pokémon Omega Ruby and Alpha Sapphire	May/Haruka	Short OVA to promote game	
2014	World Conquest Zvezda Plot	Natasha Vasylchenko/Professor Um		
2014	The Kawai Complex Guide to Manors and Hostel Behavior	Ritsu Kawai		
2014	Dragonar Academy	Jessica Valentine		
2014	The Irregular at Magic High School	Mayumi Saegusa		
2014	Broken Blade	Cleo Saburafu		
2014	If Her Flag Breaks	Megumu Tōzokuyama		
2014	Nanana's Buried Treasure	Daruku Hoshino		
2014	Mekakucity Actors	Marry Kozakura		
2014	Tokyo Ghoul	Rize Kamishiro		
2014	Akame ga Kill!	Seryu Ubiquitous		
2014	Persona 4: The Golden Animation	Marie		
2014	World Trigger	Ai Kitora		
2014	Parasyte -the maxim-	Satomi Murano		
2014	Yuki Yuna Is a Hero series	Sonoko Nogi		
2015	Unlimited Fafnir	Firill Crest		
2015	Durarara!! x2 series	Anri Sonohara		
2015	Maria the Virgin Witch	Ezekiel		
2015	Takamiya Nasuno Desu	Marimo Bandō		
2015	Yamada-kun and the Seven Witches	Mikoto Asuka		
2015	Castle Town Dandelion	Akane Sakurada		
2015	Ushio and Tora	Jie Mei		
2015	Gatchaman Crowds Insight	Gel Sadra		
2015	Prison School	Hana Midorikawa		
2015	Ultimate Otaku Teacher	Reiko Mukyou		
2015	Turnover	Chizuru Yamazaki		
2016	Prince of Stride: Alternative	Nana Sakurai		
2016	Girls Beyond the Wasteland	Yuka Kobayakawa		
2016	Ojisan to Marshmallow	MIO5 (Degas)		
2016	Fairy Tail	Zera		
2016	Ange Vierge	SW=Code Omega 46 Senia	Also promotional video for game in 2013	
2016	Kanojo to Kanojo no Neko: Everything Flows	Kanojo 彼女		
2016	Orange	Naho Takamiya		
2016	Danganronpa 3: The End of Hope's Peak Academy	Chiaki Nanami		
2016	March Comes in like a Lion	Hinata Kawamoto		
2016	Poco's Udon World	Sae Fujiyama		
2016	Izetta: The Last Witch	Elvira		
2016	Bungo Stray Dogs	Lucy Maud Montgomery		
2016	Yona of the Dawn	Kaya	OVA 3	
2017	Schoolgirl Strikers	Yumi Sajima		
2017	Food Wars!: Shokugeki no Soma	Nene Kinokuni	OVA 4, Season 3 & 4	
2017	Gabriel DropOut	Raphiel Ainsworth Shiraha		
2017	Granblue Fantasy The Animation	Zeta	Season 1 episodes 12 & 13	
2017	Rewrite	Kagari	season 2	
2017	Sagrada Reset	Misora Haruki		
2017	Tenshi no 3P!	Kōme Ogi		
2017	Tsuredure Children	Yuki Minagawa		
2017	Love and Lies	Misaki Takasaki		
2017	Anime-Gataris	Bei Bei Yang		
2018	A Place Further than the Universe	Shirase Kobuchizawa		
2018	Last Hope	Queenie Yō		
2018	Layton Mystery Tanteisha: Katori no Nazotoki File	Katrielle "Kat" Layton		
2018	Cells at Work!	Red Blood Cell AE3803		
2018	Major 2nd	Mutsuko Sakura		
2018	Beatless	Mika Tsutsumi		
2018	Mr. Tonegawa: Middle Management Blues	Zawa Voice (005)	Episodes 3, 8, 16, 18, 19, 22	
2018	Phantom in the Twilight	Bayrou Ton		
2018	Steins;Gate 0	Shiina Mayuri		
2018	Happy Sugar Life	Satō Matsuzaka		
2019	Boogiepop and Others	Suiko Minahoshi		
2019	The Quintessential Quintuplets	Ichika Nakano		
2019	Senryu Girl	Nanako Yukishiro		
2019	Mix	Haruka Ōyama		
2019	Afterlost	Yuki		
2019	Demon Slayer: Kimetsu no Yaiba	Mitsuri Kanroji		
2019	Phantasy Star Online 2: Episode Oracle	Melphonshina		
2019	Pocket Monsters	Koharu (Chloe)	2019 series	
2020	Magia Record: Puella Magi Madoka Magica Side Story	Kuroe		
2020	Drifting Dragons	Vanabelle		
2020	The Case Files of Jeweler Richard	Akiko Tanimoto		
2020	Uchitama?! Have you seen my Tama?	Momo Hanasaki		
2020	Cagaster of an Insect Cage	Ilie		
2020	Listeners	Roz		
2020	Sing "Yesterday" for Me	Shinako Morinome		
2020	Gleipnir	Elena Aoki		
2020	Princess Connect! Re:Dive	Aoi		
2020	Lapis Re:Lights	Eliza		
2020	Wandering Witch: The Journey of Elaina	Fran		
2020	With a Dog AND a Cat, Every Day is Fun	Inu-kun		
2021	The Quintessential Quintuplets ∬	Ichika Nakano		
2021	Gekidol	Kaworu Sakakibara		
2021	Kemono Jihen	Inari		
2021	Kiyo in Kyoto: From the Maiko House	Kiyo		
2021	Seven Knights Revolution: Hero Successor	Eren		
2021	Koikimo	Arie Matsushima		
2021	Zombie Land Saga Revenge	Maimai Yuzuriha		
2021	The Honor Student at Magic High School	Mayumi Saegusa		
2021	Kageki Shojo!!	Risa Nakayama		
2021	The Great Jahy Will Not Be Defeated!	Druj		
2021	The Fruit of Evolution	Saria		
2021	Sakugan	Zackletu		
2021	Kaginado	Kagari, Tenshi		
2021	Blue Period	Kinemi Miki	Episode 8	
2021	Restaurant to Another World 2	Lastina		
2022	Police in a Pod	Miwa Makitaka		
2022	Akebi's Sailor Uniform	Yuwa Akebi		
2022	Aharen-san Is Indecipherable	Ms. Tōbaru		
2022	The Rising of the Shield Hero 2	Ost Horai		
2022	Love After World Domination	Kiki Majima		
2022	Vermeil in Gold	Elena Kimberlight		
2022	When Will Ayumu Make His Move?	Maki		
2022	I'm the Villainess, So I'm Taming the Final Boss	Lilia Reinoise		
2022	The Eminence in Shadow	Alexia Midgar		
2022	Urusei Yatsura	Ran		
2023	Endo and Kobayashi Live! The Latest on Tsundere Villainess Lieselotte	Shihono Kobayashi		
2023	Kubo Won't Let Me Be Invisible	Nagisa Kubo		
2023	Boruto: Naruto Next Generations	Eida		
2023	Sorcerous Stabber Orphen: Chaos in Urbanrama	Eris		
2023	KamiKatsu	Aruaru		
2023	Demon Slayer: Kimetsu no Yaiba – Swordsmith Village Arc	Mitsuri Kanroji		
2023	Sacrificial Princess and the King of Beasts	Sariphi		
2023	Ayaka: A Story of Bonds and Wounds	Ibara Ichijō		
2023	Dark Gathering	Eiko Hōzuki		
2023	Odekake Kozame	Kozame-chan		
2023	The Family Circumstances of the Irregular Witch	Narrator		
2024	Monsters: 103 Mercies Dragon Damnation	Flare	ONA	
2024	The Witch and the Beast	Angela-Anne Huell	Episode 10	
2024	A Condition Called Love	Hotaru Hinase		
2024	As a Reincarnated Aristocrat, I'll Use My Appraisal Skill to Rise in the World	Lysia Plaid		
2024	The Fable	Misaki Shimizu		
2024	The New Gate	Cuore Estaria		
2024	The Café Terrace and Its Goddesses	Hekiru Yoshino	Season 2	
2024	A Nobody's Way Up to an Exploration Hero	Sylphy		
2024	Neko ni Tensei Shita Oji-san	Pun-chan		
2024	Babies of Bread	Cream Bun Baby 1, Bakery Owner	ONA	
2025	Medaka Kuroiwa Is Impervious to My Charms	Tsubomi Haruno		
2025	Even Given the Worthless "Appraiser" Class, I'm Actually the Strongest	Echidna		
2025	Toilet-Bound Hanako-kun	Shijima-san of the Art Room	Season 2	
2025	The Daily Life of a Middle-Aged Online Shopper in Another World	Melissa		
2025	Your Forma	Echika Hieda		
2025	The Dinner Table Detective	Reiko Hōshō		
2025	#Compass 2.0: Combat Providence Analysis System	Amairo Kitsunegasaki		
2025	A Ninja and an Assassin Under One Roof	Konoha Koga		
2025	Teogonia	Jose		
2025	To Be Hero X	Queen		
2025	Detectives These Days Are Crazy!	Mashiro Nakanishi		
2025	Private Tutor to the Duke's Daughter	Felicia Fosse		
2025	Bullet/Bullet	Qu-0213 Kau-ane	ONA	
2025	Kaiju No. 8	Rin Shinonome	Season 2	
2025	Fate/strange Fake	Ayaka Sajyō		
2025	Summer Pockets	Nanami		
2025	Gachiakuta	Amo Empool		
2025	Princession Orchestra	White Queen/Princess Hakua		
2025	Let's Play	Sam Young		
2025	My Friend's Little Sister Has It In for Me!	Sumire Kageishi		
2025	Ninja vs. Gokudo	Shiki Yamada		
2025	Gnosia	Otome		
2025	Monster Strike: Deadverse Reloaded	Yakumo		
2026	There Was a Cute Girl in the Hero's Party, So I Tried Confessing to Her	Cecilia		
2026	Tune In to the Midnight Heart	Lemon Ando		
2026	Jujutsu Kaisen	Rika Orimoto	Season 3	
2026	Chained Soldier	Ren Yamashiro	Season 2	
2026	Agents of the Four Seasons: Dance of Spring	Kōbai Yukiyanagi		
2026	Pardon the Intrusion, I'm Home!	Rinko Nakama		
2026	Let's Go Kaikigumi	Yukinko		
2026	Dr. Stone	young female Why-Man		^{Ep. 95 credits}
2026	The World's Strongest Witch	Aries Tear Bluemoon		
2027	Shōzen	Ko Kuka		
2027	The Skull Dragon's Precious Daughter	Eve		

=== Animated films ===
List of voice performances in films
Year	Title	Role	Notes	Ref.
2009	Cencoroll	Yuki		
2010	Book Girl	Tōko Amano		
2010	King of Thorn	Kasumi Ishiki		
2012	Blood-C: The Last Dark	Hiro Tsukiyama		
2012	Nerawareta Gakuen	Kahori		
2012	Inazuma Eleven GO vs. Danbōru Senki W	Ran Hanasaki		
2012	Blue Exorcist: The Movie	Shiemi Moriyama		
2013	Aura: Koga Maryuin's Last War	Ryōko Satō		
2013	Steins;Gate: Fuka Ryōiki no Déjà vu	Mayuri Shiina		
2013	The Garden of Words	Yukari Yukino		
2014	Bodacious Space Pirates: Abyss of Hyperspace	Chiaki Kurihara		
2015	Psycho-Pass: The Movie	Akane Tsunemori		
2015	The Empire of Corpses	Hadary Lilith		
2015	Go! Princess Pretty Cure the Movie: Go! Go!! Gorgeous Triple Feature!!!	Panpururu	Pumpkin Kingdom's Treasure segment	
2016	Yu-Gi-Oh!: The Dark Side of Dimensions	Sera		
2016	Your Name	Yukari Yukino		
2016	Orange: Future	Naho Takamiya		
2017	The Night Is Short, Walk on Girl	The Girl With Black Hair		
2017	Blame!	Cibo		
2017	The Irregular at Magic High School: The Movie – The Girl Who Summons the Stars	Mayumi Saegusa		
2017	Fireworks	Miura		
2017	Fūsen Inu Tinny: Nandaka Fushigi na Kyōryū no Kuni	Nitty		
2017	Godzilla: Planet of the Monsters	Yuko Tani		
2018	Waka Okami wa Shōgakusei!	Young Mineko		
2019	Cencoroll Connect	Yuki		
2019	Weathering with You	Kana		
2019	The Legend of the Galactic Heroes: Die Neue These Seiran	Hildegard von Mariendorf		
2019	Human Lost	Yoshiko Hiiragi		
2019	In This Corner (and Other Corners) of the World	Teru		
2020	Happy-Go-Lucky Days	Ecchan		
2021	Jujutsu Kaisen 0	Rika Orimoto		
2022	Goodbye, Don Glees!	Chibori "Tivoli" Urayasu		
2022	The Quintessential Quintuplets Movie	Ichika Nakano		
2022	Drifting Home	Juri Ando		
2022	Break of Dawn	Haruka Sawatari		
2022	Suzume	Tsubame Iwato		
2023	Fate/strange Fake: Whispers of Dawn	Ayaka Sajō		
2023	Hokkyoku Hyakkaten no Concierge-san	Female Japanese Wolf		
2023	Psycho-Pass Providence	Akane Tsunemori		
2024	Mononoke the Movie: Phantom in the Rain	Kitagawa		
2024	Wonderful Pretty Cure! The Movie: A Grand Adventure in a Thrilling Game World!	Natsuki		
2024	Zegapain STA	Ryoko Kaminagi		
2025	Eiga Odekake Kozame Tokai no Otomodachi	Kozame-chan		
2025	Make a Girl	Eri Uminaka		
2025	Demon Slayer: Kimetsu no Yaiba – The Movie: Infinity Castle	Mitsuri Kanroji		
2025	Tatsuki Fujimoto Before Chainsaw Man	Shikaku	Compilation Film (Segment: Shikaku)	
2026	All You Need Is Kill	Shasta		
2026	Witch on the Holy Night	Alice Kuonji		

=== Video games ===
List of voice performances in video games
Year	Title	Role	Notes	Ref.
2005	Psychonauts	Lili Zanotto	Microsoft Windows, Xbox	
2007	Getsumento Heiki Mina: Two of Project M	Nakoru Hazemi / Mīna Minazuki	PS1/PS2	
2008	Aria The Origination: Aoi Hoshi no Il Cielo	Agnes Dumas	PS1/PS2	
2008–15	To Love-Ru games	Yuki Mikan	DS	
2008	Nogizaka Haruka no Himitsu: Cosplay Hajimemashita	HachiSaki sadness	PS1/PS2	
2008–09	Akai Ito DS 赤い糸	Sara	DS, Also Akai Ito Destiny DS	
2009	The Idolmaster Dearly Stars	Eri Mizutani	DS	
2009–11	Steins;Gate series	Mayuri Shiina		
2009	Sekirei: Mirai Kara no Okurimono	Kusano	PS1/PS2	
2009	Tokimeki Memorial 4	Rhythmy Kyono	PSP	
2009	Tales of Graces	Sophie	Wii	
2009	Lina no Atelier: Strahl no Renkinjutsushi	Ezerin-Frieden	DS	
2010	Strike Witches: Anata to Dekiru Koto – A Little Peaceful Days	Amaki Suwa	PS1/PS2	
2010	Durarara!! 3-way Standoff	Anri Sonohara	PSP	
2010–25	Tales of Graces f	Sophie	PS3 in 2010, PS4, PS5, Xbox One, Xbox Series X, Nintendo Switch, Windows in 2025	
2011–13	Oreimo games	Kuroneko, Hinata Gokō	PSP	
2011	Atelier Violet: The Alchemist of Gramnad 2	Sphere	PSP	
2011	Tales of the World: Radiant Mythology 3	Sophie	PSP	
2011	Rune Factory Oceans	Iris		
2011	Gloria Union	Ruru	PSP	
2011	Rewrite	Kagari	PC, also 2014 port	
2011–12	Tsugi no Giseisha o Oshirase Shimasu series	Kasumi Mikami	PSP	
2011	Final Fantasy Type-0	Deuce	PSP	
2011–14	Ro-Kyu-Bu! games	Tomoka Minato	PSP	
2011	Shin Kamaitachi no Yoru: 11 Hitome no Suspect	Yukino Shirakawa	Other	
2012	Heroes Phantasia	Suou Pavlichenko	PSP	
2012	Boku wa Tomodachi ga Sukunai Portable	Kobato Hasegawa	PSP	
2012	Nendoroid Generation	Mayuri Shiina, Black Rock Shooter	PSP	
2012	Persona 4 Golden	Marie	PS Vita	
2012	Assault Gunner's	Kasumi Hokiyoshi	Other	
2012	Danganronpa 2: Goodbye Despair	Chiaki Nanami	PSP	
2012	Bakemonogatari Portable	Nadeko Sengoku	PSP	
2012	Hyperdimension Neptunia Victory	Plutia / Iris Heart	PS3, also Re;birth3 in 2014	
2012	Skullgirls	Ms. Fortune, Robo-Fortune	PS4, PC	
2012	Tokyo Babel	Raziel	PC	
2012	Time and Eternity	Toki	PS3	
2013	7th Dragon 2020-II	Unit 13, Marina	PSP	
2013	Date A Live Rinne Utopia	Rinne Sonogami	PS3	
2013	Negai no Kakera to Shirogane no Agreement 願いの欠片と白銀の契約者	Jessica Francois Magritte	PC	
2013	Nanami to Issho ni Manabo! English Joutatsu no Kotsu ナナミと一緒に学ぼ！English上達のコツ	Nanami	DS	
2013	Saki: Achiga Hen episode of side-A Portable	Kuro Matsumi	PSP	
2013	Magi: Hajimari no Meikyū	Kōgyoku Ren	Playable character in update	
2013	Danganronpa 1・2 Reload	Chiaki Nanami	Other	
2013–14	Kaihou Shoujo Sin	Shoko Ozora	PS3	
2014	Super Heroine Chronicle	Charlotte Dunois	character from Infinite Stratos	
2014	Infinite Stratos 2: Ignition Hearts	Charlotte Dunois		
2014	Granblue Fantasy	Zeta, Sophie	iOS/Android	
2014	School Girl Strikers	Sunashima Yumizu	Other	
2014	Liberation Maiden SIN	Shoko Ozora	Also sang ending theme	
2014	Persona 4 Arena Ultimax	Marie	PS3	
2014	Tales of the World: Reve Unitia	Sophie	DS	
2014	The Irregular at Magic High School	Mayumi Saegusa	Other	
2014	Dengeki Bunko: Fighting Climax	Tomoka Minato, Kuroneko		
2014	Nisekoi Marriage?	Kosaki Onodera	Other	
2015	Durarara!! Relay	Anri Sonohara	PS Vita	
2015	Princess Connect	Midori Futaba	Other	
2015	Broken Age	Velouria Beastender "Vella" Tartine	Microsoft Windows, iOS, PlayStation 3, PlayStation 4, Xbox 360, Wii U, Nintendo Switch	
2015	Dragon Quest Heroes: The World Tree's Woe and the Blight Below	Nera Briscoletti		
2015	Rodea the Sky Soldier	Ion		
2015	Angel Beats! -1st Beat-	Angel	PC	
2015	The Great Ace Attorney: Adventures	Susato Mikotoba	3DS	
2015	Date A Live: Twin Edition Rio Reincarnation	Rinne Sonogami	PS Vita	
2015	Prince of Stride	Nana Sakurai	Other	
2015	Persona 4: Dancing All Night	Marie	DLC	
2015	Infinite Stratos 2: Love and Purge	Charlotte Dunois		
2015	Saki: The Nationals	Kuro Matsumi	PS Vita	
2015	MegaTagmension Blanc + Neptunia VS Zombies	Plutia / Iris Heart	Other	
2015	Hyperdimension War Neptunia VS Sega Hard Girls: Dream Fusion Special	Plutia	Other	
2015	Bloodborne: The Old Hunters	Saint Adeline / girl	Other	
2015	Nitroplus Blasterz: Heroines Infinite Duel	Akane Tsunemori	PS3	
2015	Steins;Gate 0	Mayuri Shiina		
2015	Dengeki Bunko: Fighting Climax Ignition	Tomoka Minato, Kuroneko		
2015	Miracle Girls Festival	Minori Nakazawa	Other	
2016	Koyomimonogatari	Nadeko Sengoku	Other	
2016	Psycho-Pass selection defunct happiness	Akane Tsunemori	Other	
2016	Girls Beyond the Wasteland	Yūka Kobayakawa		
2016	Skullgirls: 2nd encore	Miss Fortune, Robo Fortune	Other	
2016	Phantom of the Kill	Longinus	Other	
2016	Otomate: Period Cube	Mycelia	Other	
2017	Kingdom Hearts HD 2.8 Final Chapter Prologue	Invi	Kingdom Hearts χ Backcover movie	
2017	Dissidia Final Fantasy Opera Omnia	Rinoa Heartilly	Android, iOS	
2017	The Great Ace Attorney 2: Resolve	Susato Mikotoba	3DS	
2017	Infinite Stratos: Archetype Breaker	Charlotte Dunois	Mobile Game	
2017	Mobile Legends: Bang Bang	Kagura	Android, iOS	
2017	Yuki Yuna is a Hero: Hanayui no Kirameki	Sonoko Nogi	Android, iOS	
2018	Dissidia Final Fantasy NT	Rinoa Heartilly	Arcade/PC/PS4	
2018	The King of Fighters All Star	Noah	Android/iOS	
2018	Onmyouji Arena	Menreiki	Mobile Game	
2018	Destiny Child	Chang'e	Mobile Game	
2018	Kai-Ri-Sei Million Arthur	Percival	Mobile Game	
2018	Sangokushi Monogatari	Cao Cao (Sousou Moutoku)	Mobile Game	
2018	Puella Magi Madoka Magica Side Story: Magia Record	Nadeko Sengoku (Madogatari Special Event)	Mobile Game	
2018	Dragalia Lost	Maribelle	Mobile Game	
2018	Summer Pockets	Nanami	PC	
2018	Food Fantasy	Eggette, Gingerbread & Laba Congee	Mobile Game	
2019	Saint Seiya: Awakening	Mermaid Tethys	Mobile Game	
2019	Sword Art Online: Alicization Rising Steel	Edith Synthesis Ten	Mobile Game	
2020	Arknights	Blemishine	Mobile Game	
2020	Girls' Frontline	Angelica	iOS, Android	Gunslinger Girl collaboration event
2021	Arknights	Blemishine	iOS, Android	
2021	Shining Nikki	Nikki	iOS, Android	
2021	Alchemy Stars	Areia, Eve	iOS, Android	
2021	Psychonauts 2	Lili Zanotto	Microsoft Windows, Xbox One, Xbox Series X/Xbox Series S	
2021	Counter:Side	Yuki (Gaeun)	iOS, Android, Microsoft Windows	
2021	Sin Chronicle	Anne	iOS, Android	
2022	Arknights	Luo Xiaohei	iOS, Android	The Legend of Luo Xiaohei collaboration event
2022	Witch on the Holy Night	Alice Kuonji	Nintendo Switch, PS4	
2022	Blue Archive	Atsuko Hakari	Android, iOS	
2022	Goddess of Victory: Nikke	Marian / Modernia	Android, iOS	
2022	Fitness Runners	Naomi	Nintendo Switch	
2023	Mahjong Soul	Eve Krist	PC, Android	
2023	Heaven Travel	Lofn	Android, iOS	
2024	Punishing: Gray Raven	Black Rock Shooter	Microsoft Windows, Android, iOS (Collaboration event with Black Rock Shooter)	
2025	Azur Lane	Black Rock Shooter	Android, iOS (Collaboration event with Black Rock Shooter)	
2025	Honkai: Star Rail	Yao Guang	Windows, iOS, Android, PlayStation 5	
2026	Dissidia Duellum Final Fantasy	Rinoa Heartilly	Android, iOS	

=== Drama CDs ===
List of voice performances in drama CDs
Title	Role	Notes	Ref.
Arpeggio of Blue Steel	Iori Watanuki		
Boku, Otariman ja:ぼく、オタリーマン	Junior (woman)		
D-Frag!	Roka Shibasaki		
Dog Days	Noir Vinocacao		
Infinite Stratos	Charlotte Dunois		
Kiss Him, Not Me	Kae Serinuma		
Maid Sama!	Sakura Hanazono		
No-Rin	Minori Nakazawa		
Oreimo	Kuroneko		
Ro-Kyu-Bu!	Tomoka Minato		
Wandering Witch: The Journey of Elaina	Fran		

=== Live action ===
List of acting performances in film and television
Year	Title	Role	Notes	Ref.
2013	Film Documentaire de claire		Reached 7 on Blu-ray Chart	
2015	Go! Go! Kaden Danshi	Herself	live-action and animation combination film	
2015	Kimi ga Inakucha Dame Nanda (君がいなくちゃだめなんだ, It's Definitely No Good You're Not Here)		first live-action feature film debut	
2018	Nagoya yuki Saishū Ressha 2018			
2020	Maybe Happy Ending	Clara	Stage play	
2022	Anime Supremacy!	Magical girl (voice)		
2022	Nagoya-iki Saishuu Ressha (名古屋行き最終列車, The Last Train to Nagoya)	Mirai Fujita		
2024	ACMA:GAME	Orochi (voice)		
2024	Acma: Game: The Final Key	Orochi (voice)		

=== Dubbing ===
Live-action

Year	Title	Role	Voiceover for	Notes	Ref.
2017	Miss Peregrine's Home for Peculiar Children	Emma Bloom	Ella Purnell		
2017	Living with Mother-in-Law	Minh Vân	Bảo Thanh		
2017	Game Shakers	Babe Carano	Cree Cicchino		
2017	Heidi	Heidi	Anuk Steffen		
2017	A Dog's Purpose	Young Hannah	Britt Robertson		
2018	Legend of the Demon Cat	Yulian	Zhang Tianai		
2020	Birds of Prey	Cassandra Cain	Ella Jay Basco		
2020	Escape Room	Zoey Davis	Taylor Russell		
2020	Dolittle	Betsy	Selena Gomez		
2020	Rambo: Last Blood	Gabrielle	Yvette Monreal		
2020	Jexi	The voice of Jexi	Rose Byrne		
2020	Wonder Woman 1984	Young Diana	Lilly Aspell		
2021	Zoey's Extraordinary Playlist	Zoey Clarke	Jane Levy		
2022	Clifford the Big Red Dog	Emily Elizabeth	Darby Camp		
2022	Escape Room: Tournament of Champions	Zoey Davis	Taylor Russell		
2022	St. Elmo's Fire	Wendy Beamish	Mare Winningham	The Cinema edition	
2023	Meg 2: The Trench	Jess	Skyler Samuels		
2024	Dune: Part Two	Alia Atreides	Anya Taylor-Joy		
2025	Mickey 17	Dorothy	Patsy Ferran		
2026	Lord of the Flies	Piggy	David McKenna		
2026	Masters of the Universe	Roboto	Kristen Wiig		

Animation

Year	Title	Role	Notes	Ref.
2020	The Legend of Hei	Luo Xiaohei		
2024	Inside Out 2	Envy		

=== Other works ===
List of voice performances in other works
Year	Title	Role	Notes	Ref.
2009	"Sōhaku Shisuferia" music video by Shoujo Byou	Voice of Shisuferia		
2014	Project Itoh's Harmony film trailer	Narrator		

== Discography ==
=== Albums ===
List of albums, with selected chart positions
Title	Album details	Peak position
Title	Album details	JPN
Claire	Released: February 20, 2013; Label: Aniplex; Catalog No.: SVWC-7929	6
25	Released: February 26, 2014; Label: Aniplex; Catalog No.: SVWC-7988/90, SVWC-7991/92	8
Blue Avenue	Released: April 22, 2015; Label: Aniplex; Catalog No.: SVWC-70064/5, SVWC-70066	12
Opportunity	Released: February 22, 2017; Label: Aniplex; Catalog No.: SVWC-70251/2, SVWC-70253	15
Kokobase	Released: February 20, 2019; Label: Sacra Music	18
Blossom	Released: February 23, 2022; Label: Pony Canyon	19
Memoirs and Fingertips (追憶と指先, Tsuioku to Yubisaki)	Released: April 10, 2024; Label: Pony Canyon	19

=== Singles ===
List of singles, with selected chart positions
Title	Year	Catalog No.		Peak position		Album
Title	Year	Limited edition	Regular edition	JPN Oricon	JPN Billboard	Album
"Starry Sky Destination" (星空☆ディスティネーション, Hoshi‐zora☆Disutinēshon)	2012	SVWC-7840	SVWC-7842	7	23	Claire
"The Sound of First Love" (初恋ノオト, Hatsukoi no Oto)	2012	SVWC-7863	SVWC-7865	4	31	Claire
"happy endings"	2012	SVWC-7899/900	SVWC-7901	7	33	Claire
"Silent Snow"	2013	SVWC-7926/27	SVWC-7928	8	43	Claire
"Love Planet" (恋する惑星, Koisuru Wakusei)	2013	SVWC-7974/75	SVWC-7976	11	34	25
"Smile Mode" (ほほ笑みモード, Hohoemi Mōdo)	2014	SVWC-70021/22	SVWC-70023	12	28	Blue Avenue
"Cocytus" (こきゅうとす, Kokyūtosu)	2014	SVWC-70041/2	SVWC-70043	13	27	Blue Avenue
"I'm Useless Without You" (君がいなくちゃだめなんだ, Kimi ga Inakucha Dame Nanda)	2015	SVWC-70053/54	SVWC-70055	13	45	Blue Avenue
"Transparent Girl" (透明な女の子, Tōmei na Onna no Ko)	2016	SVWC-70138/9	SVWC-70140	20	87	Opportunity
"New Song" (あたらしいうた, Atarashī Uta)	2016	SVWC-70170/1	SVWC-70172	14	56	Opportunity
"Rough" (ざらざら, Zarazara)	2016	SVWC-70225/6	SVWC-70227	20	66	Opportunity
"A Person Loved in the Spring Is Who I Long to Be" (春に愛されるひとに わたしはなりたい, Haru ni Aisareru Hito ni Watashi wa Naritai)	2018	VVCL-1164/5	VVCL-1166	15	—	Kokobase
"I'm Alright" (大丈夫, Daijōbu)	2018	VVCL-1267/8	VVCL-1269	27	97	Kokobase
"I'm Alright" (大丈夫, Daijōbu)	2018	VVCL-1270/1	VVCL-1269	27	97	Kokobase
"Moonlight Magic"	2021	SCCG-00082	PCCG-02058	18	—	blossom
"Pokerface" (駆け引きはポーカーフェイス, Kakehiki wa Poker Face)	2022	PCCG-02162	PCCG-02163	13	—	Tsuioku to Yubisaki
"Not as Dramatic As..." (ドラマチックじゃなくても, Dramatic ja Nakutemo)	2023	PCCG-02210	PCCG-02209	14	—	Tsuioku to Yubisaki
"Intaglio" (インタリオ)	2023	PCCG-02297	PCCG-02298	25	—	Tsuioku to Yubisaki

==== Digital Singles ====
Title	Release date	Album
"magical mode (Chinese Version)"	February 3, 2021	Non-album singles
"magical mode"	March 31, 2021	Non-album singles
"Shinobi-nai"	November 3, 2021	blossom
"Circle"	April 5, 2023	Tsuioku to Yubisaki
"Haiiro"	July 17, 2023	Tsuioku to Yubisaki

== Tours ==
- Kana Hanazawa concert tour 2019 (2019, in Japan and China)

== Awards ==
Year	Award	Category	Result	Ref.
2015	9th Seiyu Awards	Best Supporting Actress	Won	
2015	Newtype Anime Awards	Best Voice Actress	Won	
2017	Newtype Anime Awards	Best Voice Actress	2nd place	
2018	Newtype Anime Awards	Best Voice Actress	Won	
