= The Legend of Hei =

2019 Chinese animated film by MTJJ

- Theatrical release poster
- Chinese: 罗小黑战记
- Directed by: MTJJ (Zhang Ping)
- Based on: The Legend of Luo Xiaohei by MTJJ
- Produced by: Joy Pictures
- Starring: Xin Shan; Wang Zhen; Xianghai Hao; Mingyue Liu
- Production company: HMCH
- Distributed by: Huaxia Film Distribution
- Release date: 7 September 2019
- Running time: 101 minutes
- Country: China
- Language: Mandarin
- Box office: US$48.5 million

The Legend of Hei (Chinese: 罗小黑战记; pinyin: Luó xiǎohēi zhàn jì; trans. "The Legend of Luo Xiaohei") is a 2019 animated film prequel to the animated series, The Legend of Luo Xiaohei. It details various events in the life of the cat spirit Luo Xiaohei which take place before the series.

A sequel titled The Legend of Hei II was released on 18 July 2025 in China.

== Synopsis ==
Xiaohei, a cat spirit who shapeshifts begins his wandering journey because his home is destroyed by humans. On a search for a new home, he encounters human allies as well as other spirits, some of which share his dislike of humans. Being kidnapped by a human called Infinity, Hei spends time with him involuntarily and starts questioning his dislike for humans. This leaves him with the dilemma of which side to choose.

== Characters ==
- Xiao Hei/Hei (小黑)

Voiced by: Shan Xin (Chinese); Kana Hanazawa (Japanese); Emi Lo (English)

- Wu Xian/Infinity (无限)

Voiced by: Liu Mingyue (Chinese); Mamoru Miyano (Japanese); Aleks Le (English)

- Feng Xi/Storm End (风息)

Voiced by: Hao Xianghai (Chinese); Takahiro Sakurai (Japanese); Howard Wang (English)

== Releases ==
The Legend of Hei was released on 7 September 2019 in China. Its Japanese-dubbed version received a theatrical release a month later, distributed by Toho Cinemas. It was subsequently released with an English dub by Shout! Studios across the US and Canada in 2021.

== Sequel ==
A sequel, The Legend of Hei II, was released on 18 July 2025 in China and on 5 September 2025 in Canada and the US, followed by a release in Japan on 7 November 2025.
