= List of Yamada-kun and the Seven Witches characters =

This is a list of fictional characters appearing in the Japanese manga series Yamada-kun and the Seven Witches by Miki Yoshikawa.

== Main characters ==
=== Ryu Yamada ===
Ryu Yamada (山田 竜, Yamada Ryū) is an apathetic delinquent who finds high school boring and is failing in his school's academics. That is until he crashes into Shiraishi, the student academic ace of the school, at the stairs and ends up swapping bodies with her.^{Ch. 1} They discover the kiss activates the body swap, and Yamada can swap with others,^{Ch. 5} although he later learns he has actually duplication power. He can copy the power of the witch he has kissed,^{Ch. 18} and the manga profile describes him as the "Copy Guy".^{Vol. 8 profiles} He later confesses his developed feelings for Shiraishi which she returns and the two began dating.^{Ch. 90} After Yamada recovers his full memories, he remembers they became a couple during their first year.^{Ch. 225} At the series conclusion set ten years later, Yamada works as a successful businessman in development. He proposes to Shiraishi who happily accepts and the two become married.^{Ch. 242-243} Yamada's favorite food is yakisoba bread, and he even has a stuffed toy based on it named Sobasshimi (そばっし美).^{Ch. 105, 131} He is portrayed by Yusuke Yamamoto in the live-action adaptation, and voiced by Ryōta Ōsaka in Japanese and by Newton Pittman in English.

=== Urara Shiraishi ===
Urara Shiraishi (白石 うらら, Shiraishi Urara) is introduced as the student ace. She holds the highest grades in her class. However, she is bullied by other girls who are envious of her academic success. Her decision not to go to college worry the teachers and the student council. When she discovers her body-swapping powers with Yamada, the two resolve each other's problems in school. She begins to make friends and have a social life. Toranosuke Miyamura appoints her the president of the Supernatural Studies Club.^{Vol. 1} The manga profile describes her as the "Switch Witch".^{Vol. 8 profiles} After numerous adventures with Yamada, she eventually agrees to be his girlfriend.^{Ch. 90} Later memories show she and Yamada had started dating since their first year in high school.^{Ch. 225} She was first attracted to Yamada when she was isolated in high school and he called her out for being boring. She accepted the role of the "Original Witch" who enabled the witch powers at the school, so she could be with Yamada, at the cost of having everyone except for Yamada forget her and she would forget him when she leaves school during her senior year. When she returns for graduation, Yamada's comment about her being boring again as well as later kissing Yamada enables her to recover her memories. ^{Ch. 237-243} Ten years later, she has become a successful businesswoman, and awaiting Yamada's marriage proposal.^{Ch. 242} The final chapter covers their wedding, and some years later, talking with their two children about their story.^{Ch. 243} She is portrayed by Mariya Nishiuchi in the drama series, and is voiced by Saori Hayami in Japanese and by Mikaela Krantz in English in the anime. At her panel at Anime Expo 2015, Yoshikawa said that Shiraishi was her favorite Yamada-kun character to draw, and that her favorite feature to draw was her hair. Yoshikawa has also noted that whenever Yamada and Shiraishi have exchanged bodies, she has Shiraishi do things like walk bow-legged.^{Vol. 1 author's notes} The editor for the English manga version wrote that "Her smile, which she shows from time to time, is so cute that it should be made illegal."^{Vol. 8 profiles}

== Supernatural Studies Club ==
Toranosuke Miyamura revives the Supernatural Studies Club when he learns of Yamada and Shiraishi's body- swapping ability. He appoints Shiraishi to be the president. Miyabi Itou joins the club and Kentaro Tsubaki later joins after some events. Following the encounter with the seventh witch, Yamada leaves the club.

The members of the Supernatural Studies Club include:

=== Toranosuke Miyamura ===
Toranosuke Miyamura (宮村 虎之介, Miyamura Toranosuke) is the student council vice-president who convinces Yamada and Shiraishi to join the dying Supernatural Studies Club as a de facto meeting place for the two to swap bodies.^{Ch. 5} He has a jovial personality, often flirting with Yamada and other members to try out the kiss-activated witch powers. After becoming student council president and later facing a vote of no confidence, he reveals the only reason he pursued the presidency was to get his sister Leona to attend school once more. In the epilogue chapters he becomes a diplomat and is Yamada's best man at his wedding.^{Ch. 242} The manga profiles describe him as "the polar opposite of Yamada; he's the most popular kid in school."^{Vol. 3 profiles} In the TV drama series, he is portrayed by Ide Takuya of the J-pop band Ships. In the anime, he is voiced by Toshiki Masuda in Japanese and by Todd Haberkorn in English.

=== Miyabi Itou ===
Miyabi Itou (伊藤 雅, Itō Miyabi) is a girl who is obsessed with supernatural phenomena who one day decides to join the Supernatural Studies Club to the other members' surprise. She can be naive at times, after purchasing evidence of "supernatural" phenomena in order to get people to like her.^{Ch. 7} In the epilogue, she becomes a teacher at Suzaku High.^{Ch. 243} Yoshikawa remarked in an Natalie interview that Ito seems to be very popular among her male readers. She also remarked that Miyabi is "not all there" so she is easy to make come alive. The manga profile describes her as the only member who is into the occult, and a "bona fide idiot who rushes headlong into things".^{Vol. 3 profiles} At the end of some of the manga volumes, she keeps notes on the various witches and their powers, and also fields a Q&A section in the English version.^{Vol. 3 notes, Vol. 4 notes} Itou is played by Reina Triendl in the TV drama series. In the anime, she is voiced by Maaya Uchida in Japanese and by Rachel Glass in English.

=== Kentaro Tsubaki ===
Kentaro Tsubaki (椿 健太郎, Tsubaki Kentarō) is a transfer student who has a crush on Shiraishi. He enjoys playing video games at the arcade, and frying tempura.^{Ch. 37} Yamada discovers Tsubaki will be the accidental cause of the old schoolhouse's fire from frying tempura. In the epilogue, he owns a three-star restaurant.^{Ch. 242-243} In the anime, he is voiced by Toshiharu Sasaki in Japanese and by Orion Pitts in English.

=== Hikaru Suzuhara ===
Hikaru Suzuhara (鈴原 光) is introduced as a first-year student at Suzaku High who is suspected to have a witch power. A former middle school delinquent, he changes his personality to be passive like his twin brother Hotaru and takes his place at school when Hotaru gets into an accident and is unable to attend. As a result, he becomes a victim of bullying when he does not strike back at his classmates. After Yamada saves him from further bullying, Hikaru admits he wants to attend Suzaku and make friends. His witch power is revealed to be the charm power, and he is allowed to attend Suzaku on the provision that he later take and pass the entrance exams on his own accord. He then joins the Supernatural Studies Club after his admission.^{Ch. 188}

== Witches ==
The witches are girls at Yamada's high school who have acquired special powers that are reflective of their desires. This power is applied when they kiss someone, with exceptions of other witches, the boys with special powers such as Yamada (who copies the ability) and Tamaki (who can cut and paste the ability), and people who are already under the influence of another witch. Some powers such as body swapping and charming are cancelled out with another kiss. The seventh witch's powers operate differently from the others.^{Ch. 73, 74} Witch powers can be stolen by certain male witches or allocated to a new witch if he takes a second witch's power while holding the first, as demonstrated with a senior girl and Noa Takigawa.^{Ch. 77} When the seven witches for a group are gathered in a ceremony, they can fulfill someone's wish, activated by a kiss by the seventh witch.^{Ch. 75, 157}

Besides Urara Shiraishi, there are the following witches:

=== Nene Odagiri ===
Nene Odagiri (小田切 寧々, Odagiri Nene) is the second vice-president of the student council, she competes with Toranosuke Miyamura as a candidate to be the next student council president. Her witch ability is to capture the hearts of people she has kissed,^{Ch. 19} and is known in the manga profile as the "Charm Witch".^{Vol. 8 profiles} However, when she kisses Yamada, she is hit with her own power, developing feelings for Yamada, which linger even after the powers are cancelled out. She is the first student to regain her memories after Yamada meets the seventh witch,^{Ch. 73, 74} and it becomes apparent to the guys such as Tamaki and Haruma that she "carries a torch" for Yamada.^{Ch. 73} She later becomes the clerk of the new student council,^{Ch. 92} and continues to help Yamada out. When Yamada tries to reclaim part of his memories, She learns that part of her own memory was manipulated, and that she has liked Yamada since the time they were in the handicrafts club.^{Ch. 164} In a later chapter, it is revealed she has been a model student of Suzaku's schools since kindergarten, and that some of her popularity made the other girls jealous which resulted in her acquiring the charm power.^{Ch. 233} In the epilogue, she and Igarashi are married and have two kids.^{Ch. 242-243} She is portrayed by Ito Ono (Haruna in High School Debut) in the drama series. In the anime, she is voiced by Eri Kitamura in Japanese and by Jessica Peterson in English.

=== Meiko Otsuka ===
Meiko Ōtsuka (大塚 芽子, Ōtsuka Meiko) is the glasses-wearing president of the Manga Studies Club and the third witch that Yamada and the others encounter. As the "Thought Witch",^{Vol. 8 profiles} she uses telepathy to communicate with whomever she kisses. She grew to admire Yamada whose body was being occupied by Shiraishi at the time. She has a shy demeanor due to a lack of experience of being around other people, but she can also be bossy and demanding, especially during her club's activities. Both she and Yamada are among the worst students academically in their year.^{Ch. 25}. At the end of the series, she has become a manga artist and attends Yamada and Shiriashi's wedding.^{Ch. 243} In the drama series, she also aspires to become a manga artist.^{[ep 3]} She is portrayed by Karen Miyama. She is voiced by Yui Makino in Japanese and by Michelle Rojas in English in the anime.

=== Maria Sarushima ===
Maria Sarushima (猿島 マリア, Sarushima Maria) is a transfer student who has the ability of precognition, that is, to see a glimpse of the future from the perspective of the person she kisses.^{Vol. 4 notes} After learning that she would be responsible for a fire at the old school building, she stops attending school, but Yamada and his friends help her out.^{Ch. 33} The manga profile calls her the "Prediction Witch".^{Vol. 8 profiles} She has a very friendly personality and is able to talk to anyone easily. Later in the series, she pursues a modeling job and often tries to get Yamada's opinion on her photos. Her family later hosts the American foreign exchange student Alex Spencer.^{Ch. 195} In the epilogue, she has become a model and fashion designer.^{Ch. 243} In the drama series, she has a different vision, and is still attending school when she meets Yamada; she has lived in the United States.^{[ep 5]} and is portrayed by Fujiko Kojima. In the anime adaptation, she is voiced by Yuki Takao in Japanese and by Tabitha Ray in English.

=== Noa Takigawa ===
Noa Takigawa (滝川 ノア, Takigawa Noa) is a first-year student who has instigated trouble at school along with three other schoolmates.^{Ch. 43} As the "Retrocognition Witch",^{Vol. 8 profiles} Noa can see a traumatic memory of the person she kisses,^{Ch. 49} which allowed her to exploit her schoolmates. Yamada discovers she was a very lonely person, and helps set her straight, after which she develops a crush on him.^{Ch. 51} During the student council recall election storyline, she reveals that she was a victim of bullying by Kaori Yasojima.^{Ch. 142} When Yamada copies the seventh witch power, she inadvertently becomes his spotter (or as Noa puts it, his wife), that is, the person who will not forget him when he uses his memory manipulation power.^{Ch. 166} She later hangs out with Ushio, establishing the Poetry Club with him, and regularly expresses affections towards Yamada whenever she sees him. During Yamada's third year, she agrees to become president of the Supernatural Studies Club.^{Ch. 232} She attends Yamada and Shiraishi's wedding at the end of the series ten years later.^{Ch. 243} In the drama series, she is a former child actor but suffers a traumatic event in junior high.^{[ep 4]} She is portrayed by Airi Matsui (former member of Sakura Gakuin). She is voiced by Aoi Yūki in Japanese and by Alexis Tipton in English in the anime series.

=== Mikoto Asuka ===
Mikoto Asuka (飛鳥 美琴, Asuka Mikoto) is introduced as the student council secretary and Haruma's personal bodyguard. While she appears kind and collected, Asuka reveals a sadistic side to herself when she interrogates Yamada. Although she is one of the witches, known as the "Invisible Witch",^{Vol. 8 profiles} prior to the events of the series, she willingly allows Tamaki to take her powers. She later heads the Japanese Chess club which serves as opposition to Yamada and the newer student council. In the drama series, she is a witch who makes herself invisible to whomever she kisses. Her background shows a distrust of boys who would leer at her or want her to be something she is not. However, she has a crush on Yamazaki.^{[ep 6]} She is portrayed by Ryoko Kobayashi in the live-action drama, and voiced by Kana Hanazawa in Japanese and by Jeannie Tirado in English in the anime.

=== Rika Saionji ===
Rika Saionji (西園寺 リカ, Saionji Rika) is a mysterious "seventh witch" who can manipulate a person's memories regarding witches without having to kiss them, but it also makes the target forget about her. In her first appearance, she carries a parasol and wears gloves, and has gotten into a habit of not wearing underwear. However, when she tries to wipe Yamada's memory, the power ends up affecting his schoolmates, including the other witches (although those witches get their memories back with Yamada's kiss).^{Ch. 66} During the witch ceremony, she activates the wish by kissing the wish maker.^{Ch. 8} She reappears at Yamada and Shiriashi's wedding at the end of the series, looking the same as she did in high school.^{Ch. 243} In the drama series, Rika and Leona become friends as they discover the notebooks and the witches, but Rika's kiss makes Leona forget her.^{[ep 7]} She is portrayed by Yukie Kawamura. In the anime series, she is voiced by Masumi Tazawa in Japanese and by Luci Christian in English.

== Other witches ==
After Yamada wishes for the witch powers from the first seven girls to go away, he learns that other students have witch powers. Some of the powers are slightly different, and even precede the set gathered by Yamada. They appear to be supervised by Nancy, the seventh witch, who speculates there may be other groups of seven witches as well.^{Ch. 98, 107, 110, 111}

=== Tsubasa Konno ===
Tsubasa Konno (紺野 つばさ) is a basketball player who has a submission ability, but unlike Nene's charm ability, the people she kisses will obey her commands rather than try to please her out of love.^{Ch. 97-100}

=== Nancy ===
Nancy (ナンシー) is a punk-styled student who has the power to manipulate people's memories concerning witches,^{Ch. 102, 103} and to identify when someone has a witch power.^{Ch. 158} She and Sid monitor the witches and which students they affect under the guise of the light music club.^{Ch. 108} When Yamada recalls some of his memories, it is revealed that Nancy's real name is Haruko Nijino (虹野 晴子)^{Ch. 158} and that she was close friends with Sora Himekawa while also holding affections towards Yamada.^{Ch. 225} She surrenders her witch power to Igarashi, but lets Yamada copy it first.^{Ch. 166} In the epilogue it is revealed she is in a music band that has appeared on television and plans to sing at Yamada and Shiriashi's wedding reception.^{Ch. 243}

=== Kotori Moegi ===
Kotori Moegi (萌黄 ことり) is a petite student who enjoys playing with her doll. Her ability is to read someone's thoughts^{Ch. 105} and is able to use her doll as a medium for her powers instead of having to kiss someone directly.^{Ch. 106}

=== Aiko Chikushi ===
Aiko Chikushi (筑紫 愛子) is a glasses-wearing girl with long dark hair who makes money by fortune telling.^{Ch. 108} After reading a person's future, she tries to change it by disguising herself as a superhero and intervening in the conflict.^{Ch. 109}

=== Momoko Seishuin ===
Momoko Seishuin (清集院 桃子) is a portly class 2-1 student with body-swapping powers. She is a member of the judo club.^{Ch. 112-114} In the back story, when she was not obese, she was the first witch to kiss Yamada, in order to help Nancy show Yamada the witch powers.^{Ch. 159}

=== Akane Kikuchi ===
Akane Kikuchi (菊池 アカネ) is a girl with short hair that covers one of her eyes. She can turn invisible to the people she kisses.^{Ch. 134} She is a very busy person, so her appearances in the series are brief and quick.^{Ch. 134, 156}

=== Sora Himekawa ===
Sora Himekawa (姫川 そら) is the president of the Handicrafts Club. She is quite clumsy and accident prone, and her creations are scary-looking.^{Ch. 147} She has the ability to see a special romantic memory of the person she kisses.^{Ch. 151} Her next-door neighbor and childhood friend is Yuri Miura. It is revealed that she along with Nancy became friends with Yamada during their first year prior to the beginning of the series, and that she likes him,^{Ch. 161, 225} eventually confessing her feelings to him but was turned down due to Yamada holding affections for Shiraishi even back then, after which she soon lost her memory of him.^{Ch. 168, 212} In the epilogue, she and Yuri are married and have a child.^{Ch. 243}

== Male witches ==
Several witch powers are also found on the male students, some of whom can activate their powers by a method other than a kiss. Besides Ryuu Yamada and Hikaru Suzuhara, there are the following male witches:

=== Ushio Igarashi ===
Ushio Igarashi (五十嵐 潮, Igarashi Ushio) was Yamada's schoolmate and friend from middle school, but they have gone their separate ways at the beginning of high school after a fallout in which Yamada gets in trouble for beating up students.^{Ch. 21} He befriends Nene Odagiri and falls in love with her,^{Ch. 161} remaining loyal to her even after Odagiri's charm power is canceled out.^{Ch. 74} After he and Odagiri part ways, he allies with Asuka in the Japanese chess club.^{Ch. 117} He acquires the witch power of stealing a witch ability, which he applies to Moegi of mind-reading.^{Ch. 134} He eventually returns it in a deal with the student council to allow Yamada to make his wish of regaining his memories^{Ch. 156} in exchange for Nancy's seventh witch power.^{Ch. 165} He and Noa Takigawa later form the Poetry Club. In the epilogue, he and Odagiri are married and bring their two kids to Yamada and Shiraishi's wedding.^{Ch. 243} He is portrayed by Shōtarō Mamiya in the drama series, and voiced by Daisuke Ono in Japanese and by Will Short in English in the anime.

=== Shinichi Tamaki ===
Shinichi Tamaki (玉木真一, Tamaki Shinichi) is a so-called Witch Killer (also "Capture Guy" in the manga)^{Vol. 8 profiles} who has the power to rob a witch of her power and use it as his own. He is introduced as having the sixth witch's "invisibility" power, which makes him unnoticeable to schoolmates. He usually keeps to himself and can be rather snide when approached^{Ch. 53} but over time begins to open up and is recognized by Yamada and the others as a reliable friend. After Yamada meets with the seventh witch, Tamaki teams up with Yamada to reverse the effect of her powers. He later discovers he has the ability to "paste" the power back to a witch. He becomes the treasurer of the new student council,^{Ch. 92} and becomes student council president from the recall election. In the epilogue, he remains one of Yamada's friends he hangs out with and is working while still living at home.^{Ch. 242-243} In the anime series he is voiced by Shinnosuke Tachibana in Japanese and by Chris Burnett in English.

=== Jin Kurosaki ===
Jin Kurosaki (黒崎 仁) is a first-year student who is selected to be a vice-president along with Midori Arisugawa. He wears a hoodie and has a rebellious-looking appearance.^{Ch. 92, 94} He hopes to replace Yamada with himself as Miyamura's right-hand man by finding ways to appease him and gain his praise.^{Ch. 122} After he kisses Yamada, he discovers he does not body swap, and upon further investigation by kissing Arisugawa, he discovers he has a new witch ability that allows him to travel to someone's past.^{Ch. 123, 124} In the epilogue, he has opened an ikemen-themed curry shop.^{Ch. 243}

=== Rui Takuma ===
Rui Takuma (託摩 類) is a witch who got his seventh-witch power of erasing people's memories after Rika lost her power. He has long white hair, and uses a walking stick. A top student along with Shiraishi, he easily outsmarts Yamada, but he is anemic and prone to fainting spells.^{Ch. 125, 126} He finds school "uninteresting" and does not attend classes but has not been expelled for his continued absence because he possesses a genius-level intellect. Upon learning that he has witch powers, he starts attending school again, observes Yamada and his activities, and becomes very interested in his relationships with others.^{Ch. 126, 129, 132} When Yamada tries to enlist his help in regaining everybody's memories, Takuma reveals that he has a split personality which he claims has the witch ability to switch personalities with him at will. Essentially this makes him the only person in the series to possess two witch powers at the same time. His real persona is cruel, arrogant, and physically strong. He originally planned to initiate the witch ceremony using Yamada's abilities as a vessel in order to erase his physically weaker half, but later relents.^{Ch. 220-222} It is also later revealed that in their first year, he was researching the witches and coveted Shiraishi's power, resulting in a fight with Yamada which led to the student council's decision to erase the students' memories and suspend Yamada from school.^{Ch. 225} He also claims that his other darker self disappeared completely when Shiriashi left the school toward the end of the series. In the epilogue, he presides over Yamada and Shiraishi's wedding as the priest.^{Ch. 243}

=== Masamune Ichijo ===
Masamune Ichijo (一条 政宗) is a member of the Japanese chess club and the opposition to the student council.^{Ch. 135} He has the power of provocation that he activates by shaking hands with the target. This makes his targets discontent and jealous about their situation, and ready to find a scapegoat to blame their problems on.^{Ch. 136} He is shown to be quite arrogant and often antagonizes those around him with his words. After the election, he goes back to being a loner in his class.

=== Yuri Miura ===
Yuri Miura (三浦 悠理) is a member of the Japanese chess club who has short hair styled in a bowl cut. He has the power of manipulation which he can use on just one person at a time and is activated by giving the person a headbutt. The power allows him to tune into what the target is doing and control their actions as if he was playing a first-person video game.^{Ch. 136} He has a crush on his next-door neighbor Sora Himekawa,^{Ch. 147, 161} and allows her be friends with Yamada, but when her confession to Yamada was rejected and she then lost her memories, Yuri vowed to avenge her.^{Ch. 168} He later becomes the secretary for the new student council when Shinichi Tamaki is elected president.^{Ch. 214} The epilogue chapter shows him with Himekawa and their child attending Yamada and Shiraishi's wedding and regarded as a happy family.^{Ch. 243}

=== Alex Spencer ===
Alex Spencer (アレックス・スペンサー, Arekkusu supensā) is a foreign exchange student from America who obtains the body-swapping power during Yamada's third year. He agrees to reveal his power to Yamada on the condition that the latter helps him make friends at school. To accomplish this, Yamada uses Alex's physical abilities during their body-swap to impress the student body which makes him sought after by every sports club on campus. He first learned about his power and the witches from his host family schoolmate Maria Sarushima.^{Ch. 195}

== Supporting characters ==
Yoshikawa has mentioned that many of the characters in the storyline are school peers, and hardly any adults:

=== Haruma Yamazaki ===
Haruma Yamazaki (山崎 春馬, Yamazaki Haruma) is the president of the student council and is seen as the hottest guy in school. In contrast to his aloof and perverted exterior, he is actually extremely cunning and sly. He accomplishes his goals by manipulating and blackmailing clubs, including the Supernatural Studies Club. Along with the president, the rest of the student council is aware of the existence of witches. Yamazaki manipulates Yamada to find the identities of the seven witches by indulging him with information regarding the witches. He uses the identity of the seven witch as a final test to determine his successor. He later tries to prevent the witches from gathering, but eventually relents in order to determine why he ended up becoming president and to bring back his erased memories. His memories reveal that he was a member of the Supernatural Studies Club where he was in a close relationship with Leona Miyamura whom he had protected when Rika Saionji appeared to erase their memories. He later goes to university where he studies psychology but takes time to enjoy the freedoms of college life.^{Ch. 229} At the end of the series, he works in advertising and has an established relationship with Leona.^{Ch. 243} In the drama series, Haruma discovers he has the "witch killing" ability, that is he can take a witch's power with a kiss, and give it back with another kiss.^{[ep 6]} He is portrayed by Hidenori Tokuyama. In the anime adaptation, he is voiced by Jun Fukuyama in Japanese and by Seth Magill in English.

=== Leona Miyamura ===
Toranosuke's older sister, Leona Miyamura (宮村 レオナ, Miyamura Reona) has been living at home, where she hurls scissors like throwing knives at intruders and people that annoy her. She and Haruma Yamazaki were close friends and the only members of the Supernatural Studies Club, but when Yamazaki discovered the identity of the seventh witch, he told her to flee the school and discovered that he had lost his memories. She has feelings for Yamazaki but rejects his confession to her at their graduation because he had used the witches' power to find out how she felt about him, but looks forward to seeing whether he will persist and try again.^{Ch. 183} She later attends a private university in London much to the dismay of both her brother and Yamazaki.^{Ch. 229} In the series epilogue, she has become an archeologist and maintains a relationship with Yamazaki.^{Ch. 243} In the drama series, she stops attending school because her memory was wiped by the seventh witch.^{[ep 7]} In the anime adaptation, she is voiced by Miyuki Sawashiro in Japanese and by Elizabeth Maxwell in English.

=== Midori Arisugawa ===
Midori Arisugawa (有栖川 翠) a first-year student who becomes one of the vice-presidents under Toranosuke Miyamura. She is described as an airhead with big breasts.^{Ch. 92, 94} Yamada discovers that although she purposely acts flirty to advance her status,^{Ch. 107} she does not have friends and keeps to herself in class.^{Ch. 113} After Miyamura retires, she continues on the student council under Tamaki's guidance. She is present at Yamada and Shiriashi's wedding where she is regarded as more mature but for reasons unknown.^{Ch. 243}

=== Kaori Yasojima ===
Kaori Yasojima (八十島 かおり) is the only other female member of the Japanese Chess Club besides Asuka.^{Ch. 136} She had been bullying Noa, causing the latter to develop witch powers, but later reveals that she herself has been a victim of constant bullying but deals with it by putting up a naively positive attitude. She tries to get along with the chess club despite the latter's treatment of her where they often use their powers on her. When her boyfriend cruelly dumps her and leaves her to be assaulted, Yamada saves her and uses the manipulation power to change her responses to bullying. Afterwards, she begins to stand up more for herself, and gains a friend in the process.^{Ch. 142}

=== Mutta Hagiwara ===
Mutta Hagiwara (萩原 六太) is a member of the Japanese Chess Club and the only male member confirmed not to be a witch. He likes to joke around with the other members of the club.

=== Sid ===
Sid (シド) is Nancy's buddy in their "light music club". He helps Nancy monitor the other witches while providing Yamada with advice and sympathizing with his desire to make Shiraishi happy as he wishes to do the same for Nancy.^{Ch. 108}

=== Karen Kimishima ===
Karen Kimishima (君島 カレン) is the captain of the girls' archery team. She was initially suspected of being a witch by Yamada because she refused to allow the old Archery Club's room to be reconstructed for reasons that were unclear. Eventually she admits it was simply out of respect for all the club activities that have occurred throughout the room's history.^{Ch. 12, 13} She has a tendency to throw and slam things whenever she gets embarrassed,^{Ch.52} especially Yamada, whom she likes but refuses to admit.^{Ch. 105} In the anime, she is voiced by Mai Nakahara.

=== Tatsumi Yamada ===
Tatsumi Yamada (山田 辰巳) is Ryu's younger sister. She enjoys watching male idol stars.^{Ch. 33}

=== Class representative ===
A classmate of Yamada's whom he gets to know better as the class prepares for a school trip. She is one of the few students who was aware of what happened during Yamada's school year due to her immunity to the seventh witch's memory wiping powers, recording events under the alias of the 'Akashic Recorder'. She wears glasses but Yamada later discovers she is quite attractive without them. She tells Yamada that she heard that he had been dating some girl back then, but when Yamada examines her past memories it is not clear who she meant due to her never actually knowing if there was any truth behind the rumour (the person Yamada was supposedly dating appears as a silhouette with no discernible features in her memory). She is last seen attending Yamada and Shiraishi's wedding.^{Ch. 243}

=== Hino ===
A girl who had become friends with Yamada and the gang during the end of their first school year. She has a collection of pictures of them but does not remember the circumstances in which they met. She is extremely shy and paranoid that all her boy classmates are perverts, but longs for the time when she did have friends and seemed happy about school life. When Yamada uses the memory dive spell on her to see what happened that first year, he discovers that she had set Yamada up to meet with Urara.^{Ch. 212}

=== Hotaru Suzuhara ===
Hotaru Suzuhara (鈴原 蛍) is Hikaru's twin brother. Because of an accident, he was unable to attend his first day at school resulting in Hikaru posing as him to retain his admittance. He later transfers from an online school to Suzaku High and joins the Supernatural Studies Club alongside his brother.^{Ch. 232}

=== Rin Sasaki ===
Rin Sasaki (佐々木 凜) is the leader of the bullies that tormented Urara Shiraishi who has romantic feelings for Ryu Yamada due to "him" defending her. In the anime, she is voiced by Yūka Nanri in Japanese and Trina Nishimura in English.^{Ch. 1}

== Works cited ==
- "Ch." is shortened form for chapter and refers to a chapter number of the Yamada-kun and the Seven Witches manga by Miki Yoshikawa. Original Japanese version published by Kodansha. English version published by Crunchyroll Manga.
- 山田くんと7人の魔女 — スポニチ (Yamada-kun and the Seven Witches) drama, 2013, 8 episodes. (in Japanese)
