= List of Black Rock Shooter characters =

This is a list of characters from the Black Rock Shooter franchise, which consists of an original video animation, a manga series by Sanami Suzuki, a PlayStation Portable video game by Imageepoch, and a 2012 anime television series.

== Main characters ==
The main characters from the OVA as illustrated by the BRS Project. From left to right: Dead Master, Yomi Takanashi, Mato Kuroi, and Black Rock Shooter

Black Rock Shooter (ブラック★ロックシューター, Burakku Rokku Shūtā)
Voiced by: Kana Hanazawa (OVA, 2012 anime), Yui Ishikawa (2022 anime) (Japanese), Xanthe Huynh (English), Maaya Sakamoto (Game)
Black Rock Shooter, known as BRS or Rock for short, is the eponymous character of the franchise. A mysterious girl with black hair in twintails, one longer than the other, and she has two scars on her torso and her hip. Her left eye burns with a bright blue flame. She wears a pair of knee high black boots, a black bikini top, black shorts with a light gray belt, and a black hooded jacket with a long back with a white star on the back. She carries two weapons, a rock cannon that can fire rapid shots or more powerful charge shots, and a crooked katana.

In the OVA, she is a resident of the Other World who merges with Mato in order to rescue Yomi who was possessed by Dead Master. In the TV series, she is Mato's dark persona who fights against other inhabitants, regardless of its impact on the other world. In Innocent Soul, she resides in the world of Hazama, a place between Heaven and Earth, and her job is to purify stagnant souls whose regrets caused them to become trapped in this realm and become demons that attack other souls. In the game, she is a clone of White Rock Shooter, created to help combat the alien invasion currently wiping out the human race. However, it takes this clone 16 years to mature in her chamber before awakening, too late to save humanity from destruction. In Black Rock-chan, she is a chibified version of herself who is looked after by Dead Master.

Dead Master (デッドマスター, Deddo Masutā)
Voiced by: Miyuki Sawashiro (OVA, 2012 anime), Saori Hayami (2022 anime) (Japanese); Suzie Yeung (English)
Dead Master is an antagonist character who appears in the OVA, the anime television series and the Innocent Soul manga. Similar to a Gothic Lolita costume, Dead Master's clothing consists of a black dress and a black bolero; her dress extends down to her thighs and is accented with a white ribbon attached to her waist. She also wears a pair of leggings and a pair of black pumps. She wears a pair of black gauntlets on each hand. She has two black horns made of black vertebrae. She uses three weapons in her battle with Black Rock Shooter. Her primary weapon is her "Dead Scythe", which has multiple short scythes under the main scythe blade and a vertebra-like feature at the end of the handle. Her secondary mid-range weapons are her chains, whilst her two "Dead Skulls" function as her third set in both long and close-range combat.

In the OVA, Dead Master is a form of jealousy that possesses Yomi when she becomes jealous of Yuu's friendship with Mato. She is defeated when Black Rock Shooter, fused with Mato, hugs her, banishing her from Yomi's body. In the anime television series, Dead Master is Yomi's darken persona, who sports glasses and a wedding veil. Initially a captive of Chariot and then Black Gold Saw, her true power awakens when Yomi's jealousy and loneliness reaches its peak. Dead Master is inevitably killed by Black Rock Shooter, just as Mato had merged with her, causing Yomi to forget about Mato and Mato to break down, leading to the awakening of Insane Black Rock Shooter. However, she is revived after Yomi manages to regain her memories of Mato. In the Innocent Soul manga, Dead Master is a Black Star sent to free stagnate souls. Having died in a car crash in her former life, Dead was told by Ram that if she ate enough souls, she would be able to come back to life and reunite with her fiancée. When she learns this was a lie, she breaks down and becomes a stagnated soul herself who is forced to be killed by Rock. In Black Rock-chan, she serves as a guardian to both Black Rock-chan and Strength.

== Anime characters ==
=== Human world ===
Mato Kuroi (黒衣 マト, Kuroi Mato)
Voiced by: Kana Hanazawa (Japanese); Xanthe Huynh (English)
Mato is the main human world character. She loves basketball and is just starting junior-high school. She became fast friends with Yomi Takanashi on her first day of school. She joined the basketball club at her school and, despite her short stature, plays the game exceptionally well, earning her the nickname the "First Year Ace" by her older club members, a nickname she is embarrassed to be called. She lives with her little brother Hiro and her mother. She has an affinity for things with stars on them as is reflected in her room decor and clothing. She also carries around a blue cellphone with a star shaped strap on it. After Yomi goes missing, she merges with Black Rock Shooter in order to search for her in the other world.

In the anime series however her interests are focused on the multi-colored bird from her favorite children's book, "The Little Bird of Many Colors." Her cellphone in the series, instead of having the star shaped strap, has one of the little bird with multi-colored wings. Her personality is connected to this bird via story form in the series and it explains her mysterious attraction to the story. Wanting to stop Black Rock Shooter from killing all the other world characters she is sent to the other world by Strength to stop her, but arrives too late to save Dead Master. The shock of seeing Dead Master's death causes her break down and inadvertently turns Black Rock Shooter into Insane Black Rock Shooter and she becomes trapped inside her. But thanks to her friend Strength she eventually manages to regain control and separates from Insane Black Rock Shooter becoming Black Rock Shooter in the process and starts to fight with Insane Black Rock Shooter. Although she is severely injured in the fight she, along with the other otherworld personas, manages to defeat Insane Black Rock Shooter.

Yomi Takanashi (小鳥遊 ヨミ, Takanashi Yomi)
Voiced by: Miyuki Sawashiro (Japanese); Suzie Yeung (English)
Yomi is the other main character in the anime. She is a quiet and good-natured girl that in the same grade as Mato with a talent for volleyball. She recently moved into Mato's neighborhood after having been in Germany She and her family have moved around a lot during her life. After having a chat with Mato on her first day, they become fast friends and become very close, as shown by Mato buying her a star shaped cellphone strap similar to hers. After Mato joins the basketball club, Yomi joins the volleyball club so they could be together more often and learned she is actually quite good at it. After Mato befriends Yuu in their second year, she becomes jealous and lonely, eventually leading to her being possessed by Dead Master. Shortly afterward, she goes missing which leads Mato to go in search for her in the other world.
In the TV series, she is the member of the school's art club who takes an interest in Mato after she offers her friendship. However, she is intimidated by Kagari, who doesn't want her to make other friends, and she is left in a very fragile mental state even after Kagari's recovery. After Mato and Yomi manage to help Kagari break free from her dependence on her and she starts attending classes once more, Yomi's mind starts to break down in fear of the growing distance between her and her friends, a situation aggravated by Saya who tells her that she would be hardly missed anyway. She ends up forgetting about Mato when Dead Master is killed by Black Rock Shooter in the other world. However, she soon manages to regain her memories of Mato which brings Dead Master back to life and helping Mato in the other world as Black Rock Shooter to defeat Insane Black Rock Shooter.

Yuu Kotari (神足 ユウ, Kōtari Yū)
Voiced by: Kana Asumi (Japanese); Dani Chambers (English)
Yuu is a supporting character in the anime. In the OVA, she is put into Mato's class after Mato and Yomi were put into different classes at the beginning of their second year in junior-high. Shorter than Mato, she could not play basketball due to her height, so she settled on becoming the basketball club's manager and first aid person. After befriending Mato, she became slightly possessive of her, even saying that Yomi's disappearance is nothing to worry about.
In the TV series, Yuu serves as the strongest connection to the other world. Having been seriously bullied in her youth, she was befriended by Saya. Due to the overwhelming emotional pain in her heart, she was able to make a connection with Strength. Preferring the idea of a world of fighting to the harshness of reality, she switched places with Strength. She reveals her true colours during her fight against Insane Black Rock Shooter, not wanting to return to reality. Although she is sent back to the real world after Strength passes away, she is able to make friends with Mato and the others.

Saya Irino (納野 サヤ, Irino Saya)
Voiced by: Mamiko Noto (Japanese); Natalie Van Sistine (English)
A student counsellor at Mato and Yomi's school. Despite claiming to offer advice to help students dealing with their personal issues, sometimes she has the habit of performing moral harassment and put great stress on them in order to awaken their other world counterparts. She is usually seen preparing, drinking and serving different brands of coffee to her guests. After befriending Yuu in high school, Saya comes to learn of the other world from her, learning of her link to Black Gold Saw. After Yuu and Strength switched places, she became determined to protect her, as well as to prevent the impact Black Rock Shooter has on the real world.

Kagari Izuriha (出灰 カガリ, Izuriha Kagari)
Voiced by: Eri Kitamura (Japanese); Kayli Mills (English)
Yomi's childhood friend and neighbour. When she was younger, she was hit by a car while chasing after Yomi, and while nothing was broken, she became dependent on Yomi, which soon developed into an obsession to stop her from making other friends. After Mato and Yomi manage to help her break free from her dependence on Yomi, Kagari returns to school and soon starts making her own friends. However, she loses memory of ever needing Yomi's help as a result of Chariot's defeat at the hands of Black Rock Shooter. However, like Yomi, she eventually regains her memories of depending on Yomi. Remembering this brings Chariot back to life, who then goes on to help Mato as Black Rock Shooter in the other world defeat Insane Black Rock Shooter.

Arata Kohata (小幡 アラタ, Kohata Arata)
Voiced by: Manami Numakura (Japanese); Anairis Quiñones (English)
Mato and Yuu's senior in their basketball club. She has a habit of holding back her own tears in front of others. She had a persona created by Black Gold Saw resembling a trembling girl in a grey hooded cloak, implied to be a persona not fully matured, who was killed by Black Rock Shooter, causing Arata to forget about the boy she had a crush on. However, like the others, she manages to remember her feelings, bringing back to life her other world persona.

=== Other world ===
Strength (ストレングス, Sutorengusu)
Voiced by: Kana Asumi (OVA, 2012 anime), Megumi Han (2022 anime) (Japanese); Dani Chambers (English)
Strength is Yuu's darken persona in the other world. In the OVA, She wears black ankle boots and thigh-high stockings, with a shackle around her left ankle. She has white hair, white eyes, and a vertebra-like tail. Her clothing is a black dress with a large white flame-embroidered hooded scarf and her fist insignia on the breast. Her main weapons are two large, black "Ogre Arms" that she wears over her arms and are as big as she is. Strength's design changes slightly in the anime series. Her eye color is changed to orange, her dress sports a white trim and wilder flames, her tail is larger and more bony, and her are stockings are white.

In the TV series, she gained emotions when she established a connection with Yuu just as she was about to die following a fight with Black Rock Shooter. When Yuu preferred to live in Strength's world than reality, Strength was forced to switch bodies with Yuu. Because of this, "Yuu" in the real world so does not cast a shadow. Strength inserted false memories of herself into Mato to make it seem like they'd been friends for a long time, though she eventually came to like Mato herself. She has the ability to put herself or others into a comatose state, sending their mind into the body of their darken persona. At the series conclusion, she disappears into the wind, returning Yuu to her original body, although she revives later on to continue fighting.

Black Gold Saw (ブラックゴールドソー, Burakku Gōrudosō)
Voiced by: Mamiko Noto (Japanese); Natalie Van Sistine (English)
Black Gold Saw is a supporting character in the OVA and one of the main characters in the TV series. She has red eyes and long black hair. Similar to Black Rock Shooter, she has been depicted as having a red flame that burns from her right eye. She has two dark red horns and also has gauntlets similar to Dead Master's. Her outfit is similar to Black Rock Shooter's except for the design of her jacket and her bikini top; her jacket extends into a worn-out cape which is dyed red at the end. Her primary weapon is her "King Saw", a very large curved sword with a saw-like back edge. In the OVA, she defeats Black Rock Shooter and gives her distinctive scar under her left breast. In the TV series, Black Gold Saw is Saya's darken persona in the other world, who Saya is able to link with due to Yuu's power. In Black Rock-chan, she is a teacher at a kindergarten.

Chariot (チャリオット, Chariotto)
Voiced by: Eri Kitamura (Japanese); Kayli Mills (English)
Chariot is Kagari's darken persona in the other world. Chariot is a pale skinned female wearing a dress with black and white tones. She wears black, metallic thighhighs with black and yellow wheels, a large spiked crown on her head, as well as claw-like gloves. After she is defeated by Black Rock Shooter and her body is discarded by Strength, Kagari returns to her cheerful self but forgets about her dependency on Yomi. She later comes back to life after Kagari regains her memories of Yomi and goes on to help Mato as Black Rock Shooter defeat Insane Black Rock Shooter.

Insane Black Rock Shooter (インセイン・ブラック★ロックシューター, Insein Burakku Rokku Shūtā)
Voiced by: Kana Hanazawa
A more psychotic version of Black Rock Shooter formed when Mato, merged with Black Rock Shooter, becomes shocked by Dead Master's death. This version of Black Rock Shooter possesses heavy armor and a blazing purple eye and fights recklessly with disregard to her own health. Her key attack is her right arm that can be launched on a chain with her firearm, allowing her to remotely attack her opponent. She is eventually stopped when Mato stands against her and manages to defeat her thanks to the power of the other darken personas.

== Video game characters ==
Nana Gray (ナナ•グレイ, Nana Gurei)
Voiced by: Miyuki Sawashiro
Gray is a grey haired girl who has a close relationship with Black Rock Shooter. She wields a black and orange sword.

White Rock Shooter (ホワイト•ロックシューター, Howaito Rokku Shūtā)
Voiced by: Maaya Sakamoto
White Rock Shooter is a girl who looks just like Black Rock Shooter, albeit she has white hair, wears white clothing and has a right eye that burns with a pinkish magenta flame. She serves as the antagonist for Black Rock Shooter: The Game, where she plots the destruction of human kind.

Mefe (ミー, Mī)
Voiced by: Mai Nakahara
The First Apostle of Apocalypse, Mefe is a young woman clad in a magician-like outfit and wields a giant violet axe. She has a habit of speaking mixed Spanish and Japanese words, and sucks blood from young women.

Mzma (マズマ, Mazuma)
Voiced by: Tomokazu Sugita
The Second Apostle of Apocalypse, Mzma is a young man with short deep crimson hair. His ability is to manipulate flames, and his weapon is a gigantic double-edged sword with a sawtooth-shaped blade.

Szzu (シズ, Shizu)
Voiced by: Yoko Hikasa
The Third Apostle of Apocalypse, Szzu is a young, blonde lady wearing glasses and a spiked ornament in her forehead that looks like a coronet. She is quite knowledgeable of human emotions and behavior, and is the only one who truly understands her fellow Apostle Ckry, in spite of the latter's violent and savage demeanor.

Ckry (カーリー, Kārī)
Voiced by: Yoshimitsu Shimoyama
The Fourth Apostle of Apocalypse, Ckry is a pale-skinned young man with orange hair and a small beard, with a braid at his chin, and a steel-black spiked ornament at mouth height. He has a rather violent demeanor, and has is cold with the other Apostles, his twin Szzu being the only one who truly understands him, in spite of his personality.

Xnfe (ナフェ, Nafe)
Voiced by: Asami Shimoda
The Fifth Apostle of Apocalypse, Xnfe is a girl who wears a large black hood with two bunny ear-like protrusions out the top with pink laser emitters that fire a spray of laser beams from them. She carries two large black and pink laser cannons on each arm similar looking to Black Rock Shooter's cannon. She has a small army of laser shooting alien robots that she can control for long distance attacks.

Llwo (リリオ, Ririo)
Voiced by: Hiroshi Kamiya
The Sixth Apostle of Apocalypse, Llwo is a young man with dark complexion with silvery-white hair. He has certain feelings for Mefe.

Saha (ザハ, Zaha)
Voiced by: Yōsuke Akimoto
The Seventh Apostle of Apocalypse, Saha is a grey-skinned bald man who is considered to be the strongest Apostle.

== Manga characters ==
Ron (ロン)
Ron is a serpent-like creature who serves as Black Rock Shooter's companion in the manga series, Black Rock Shooter: Innocent Soul. He is able to form various weapons in Rock's arsenal, such as a blade or Rock's infamous Rock Cannon. Ron acts like a "big brother figure" to Rock and deeply cares about her.

Jack Olie
He is the main antagonist of the first chapter. Originally Jack the Ripper, his soul has been stranded in Hazama along with those of his victims until he is defeated by Rock.

Hanako Nakamura (中村 華子, Nakamura Hanako)
The main antagonist of the second chapter, Hanako is a soul with the ability to transform others into inanimate objects. During her life, she was bullied on, and wears headphones to block out all external sounds. She goes mad after they are removed, and is eventually defeated.

Cecil
She is the main antagonist of the sixth chapter. Cecil is a soul who ended up looping a memory of her and her mother. During her childhood she and her mother had a very happy relationship up until her father died which threw her mother in a slight state of insecurity. From then on she was repeatedly hit by her mother whenever she messed things up in the cafe they own or if she sees her wasting time talking to others (such as Rock). Despite the pain Cecil always kept smiling. She also managed to teach Rock to smile every once in a while. She is one of the only souls that Rock didn't have to kill to defeat.
