= The Legend of Luo Xiaohei =

Chinese animated series

罗小黑战记 (Luo Xiao Hei Zhan Ji)
- Genre: Action
- Created by: MTJJ
- Original net animation
- Music by: Mint Image, Wang Wei, Xiao Chen Ge
- Studio: Beijing Hanmu Chunhua Animation Technology Co., Ltd.
- Released: March 18, 2011 – Present
- Episodes: 41 + 3 specials

The Legend of Luo Xiaohei
- Traditional Chinese: 羅小黑戰記
- Simplified Chinese: 罗小黑战记
- Literal meaning: Luo Xiaohei's Battle Book
Transcriptions
Standard Mandarin
- Hanyu Pinyin: Luō Xiǎohēi zhàn jì

The Legend of Luo Xiaohei (罗小黑战记) is a flash animation and webtoon developed by Chinese artist MTJJ (real name Zhang Ping 章平). It derives from an animated series that was mainly broadcast online in March 2011. The franchise has also been extended to become a social media sticker series on WeChat. As of July 18, 2021, 40 episodes of "The Legend of Luo Xiaohei" are available alongside 3 extra videos, "Exam Day", "Sh…", and "Goodnight Meow". A feature-length prequel film named The Legend of Hei was released in Chinese and Japanese theaters in September, 2019. A second feature-length film The Legend of Hei II was released in 2025.

The series was adapted into a graphic novel in 2015, published by Beijing United Publishing. It has also been turned into a mobile game titled "Luo Xiaohei's Battle Demon Book" (罗小黑战记妖灵簿) by Beijing Manya Entertainment Culture Media Co.

A third season of the show is scheduled to release in October 30, 2026.

== Plot ==
The story begins on a rainy night when Luo Xiao Hei, a cat spirit, is badly injured after stealing Laojun's wish-granting pearl artifact, the Pearl of Heaven. As a result, he is transformed from his humanoid form to become his original black kitten form. He is then saved by a young girl named Luo Xiaobai, who takes him home. Luo Xiaobai and Luo Xiao Hei become good friends and their adventure begins. They live in a world where people, spirits, and gods coexist.

The first season revolves around Luo Xiao Hei and Luo Xiaobai visiting her grandfather in the countryside for the summer while her parents go on vacation. Here, she's introduced to the wider spirit world through her cousin and brother figure A'gen, who is secretly an ice-affiliated elfin. They spend much of the first half evading Laojun's attendant, Diting, and several third party groups who want to steal the pearl for their own purposes. Once Xiao Hei is able to restore his spirit energy and turn back into his Elfin form, he intended to leave Xiaobai and A'gen, but instructions from his master Wuxian allow him to stay with them a little longer.

Those instructions form the plot of the second season, where Xiao Hei is supposed to befriend a few humans and enter the world of the elfin-developed video game All Living Things in order to complete a particular vigorous quest. The quest, as it is revealed in the latter half of the season, is actually a test for Xiaohei to prepare him for his prospective job as an Executor (a type of roaming enforcer for mainstream elfin society) and graduate from his apprenticeship. Unfortunately, he is severely underleveled and has not obtained any of the items or clear conditions that he needed before nearly getting locked out of the quest for good.

== Characters ==
- Luo Xiaohei (罗小黑): The protagonist of the series. Although young, Xiaohei is a powerful, quick, and adaptable cat elfin who is training to become an Executor. In order to complete his training, he was given three tasks by his master Wuxian to complete. His first, to steal the Pearl of Heaven from Laojun, ended with him getting injured and being taken in by the Luo family. He initially hated humanity because some were responsible for the destruction of his home forest, but after learning more about them his hatred subsided.
- Luo Xiaobai (罗小白): A human girl who finds Xiao Hei in an alleyway, under the assumption that he was an abandoned cat. Xiaobai is a curious and friendly child who is welcoming to the supernatural world, although she can't quite understand certain concepts. She is close with A'gen, seeing him as an older brother figure; and Shanxin, who is her best friend and occasional gaming buddy.
- A'Gen (阿根): An elfin who lives in the countryside. He aims to protect the peace between humans and elfin, often helping other spirits out or accompanying Xiao Hei on his adventures. He is also quick-witted and teaches Xiao Bai some of the basics of the supernatural world. While he primarily uses ice magic, he is equally as adept at fire. Many elfin are under the impression that he is the powerful elfin Xuan Li taking a human guise.
- Wuxian (无限): a 437 year old human who works for the mainland's Spirit Guild as an "Executor". He also serves as Xiaohei's mentor and parental figure.
- Laojun (老君): An extremely powerful elfin who lives in his own spiritual domain, Bluestream Town. He is the owner of the Book of Vows, a long list of quests that he's given out over the centuries. Although he is interested in the human world, he is bound to his domain for 100 years and needs Diting to scout for him. In the meantime, he has grown lazy and developed an interest in games and anime.
- Shanxin (山新): A human girl who is friends with Luo Xiaobai. She is a silver tongued and tomboyish gamer and a lover of MMORPGs. Her game knowledge eventually proves useful when she is pulled into the All Living Things elfin video game, and she is made the strategist of Xiaohei's group.

== Voice cast ==
- Shanxin as Luo Xiaohei, Luo Xiaobai, A'Gen, Shanxin, and Xiaoji
- Huang Zhenji as Diting, Yunfei, and Daji
- Ding Dang as Qiguo, Tan Ju, Mu Si, A'Xian, and Dong Dong
- Xiaotan as Laojun
- Xiahou Luofeng as Kali
- Feng Sheng [zh] as Wuxian
- Taobao as Bidiu
- Ah Suo as Heixiu
- Lu Rufei as Fenmo
- Kiki as Mother

== Episodes ==
#	Title		Release date
CAT.0	Trail Notice	预告	2011-03-13
CAT.1	Meow	喵	2011-03-17; 2014-04-25remastered
CAT.2	Escape	逃	2011-06-01; 2014-04-25remastered
Special	Luo Xiaobai's Final Exam	罗小白的期末考试	2011-07-10
CAT.3	Hey	嘿	2012-01-16
CAT.4	Float	飘	2012-06-11
CAT.5	Yo	唷	2012-12-21
CAT.6	A'gen	阿根	2013-03-21
CAT.7	Bidiu	比丢	2013-06-13
CAT.8	Deep Mountain	深山	2013-09-11
CAT.8.5 Spoof	Goodbye, Bidiu	再见了，比丟	2013-09-12
CAT.9	Diting	谛听	2013-12-30
CAT.10	Laojun	老君	2014-04-28
CAT.10.5 MV	Goodnight Meow	晚安喵	2014-05-27
CAT.11	Bluestream Town	蓝溪镇	2014-07-23
CAT.12	Twelve Episodes	拾贰集	2014-09-17
CAT.13	Spiritual Power	灵质力	2014-09-28
CAT.14	Flower Fairy	花精灵	2014-12-29
CAT.15	Spiritwind Mountain	灵风山	2015-02-05
CAT.16	Immortal and Fairy	仙与精灵	2015-05-13
CAT.17	Calming	风平浪静	2015-08-19
CAT.18	Top War	顶上战争	2015-10-28
CAT.19	City Garden	城中别苑	2015-11-25
CAT.20	Elfin Guild Hall	妖灵会馆	2015-12-30
CAT.21	Target Skyshine Pearl	目标天明珠	2016-04-28
CAT.22	Meeting at Atsi Court	相遇阿呲阁	2016-06-23
CAT.23	Inside outside and winning losing	内外与胜负	2016-08-23
CAT.24	Tacit Rules	默契的规则	2016-11-30
CAT.24.5 MV	Shh	嘘	2017-01-11
CAT.25	Sprout in the Early Morning	清晨的萌芽	2017-03-30
CAT.26	Illegal or Legal Person	非法者合法者	2017-07-31
CAT.27	What's this Taste?	这是什么滋味	2017-11-29
CAT.28	Not a "Goodbye" But a "See you soon"	离别终会相见	2019-08-27
CAT.29	Spirit powers in another world	异界中的灵力	2021-04-24
CAT.30	All creatures in the game	游戏中的众生	2021-04-24
CAT.31	Four People Unable to Do Anything	寸步难行四人组	2021-05-01
CAT.32	The Elfin King Folan's Admiration	妖王佛岚的赞赏	2021-05-08
CAT.33	An Uncompletable Mission	无法完成的任务	2021-05-15
CAT.34	A Seemingly Successful Game Start	开局好像很顺利	2021-05-22
CAT.35	Between Games and Reality	游戏与现实之间	2021-05-29
CAT.36	The World of Elfins and Humans	妖精与人类的世界	2021-06-05
CAT.37	Climbing Up and Down the Mountain Are Two Missions	山上山下两个任务	2021-06-12
CAT.38	Threshold Mission Melee	门槛任务的大混战	2021-07-03
CAT.39	Battle Royale in the Forest of Giant Trees	巨树之森的大逃杀	2021-07-10
CAT.40	What Kind of Person Do You Want to Be?	你想成为怎样的人	2021-07-17
CAT.41	Let's Start Studying, Xiaohei!	开始学习吧小黑同学	2026-10-30

== Prequel film ==
The Legend of Hei is an animated film prequel to the animated series The Legend of Luo Xiaohei released in summer 2019. The movie details various events in the life of Luo Xiaohei before the show.
