= Yamada-kun and the Seven Witches =

Japanese manga series and its adaptations

- First tankōbon volume cover, featuring Urara Shiraishi

山田くんと7人の魔女 (Yamada-kun to nana-nin no majo)
- Genre: Harem; Romantic comedy; Supernatural
- Manga
- Written by: Miki Yoshikawa
- Published by: Kodansha
- English publisher: NA: Kodansha USA
- Imprint: Shōnen Magazine Comics
- Magazine: Weekly Shōnen Magazine
- Original run: February 22, 2012 – February 22, 2017
- Volumes: 28
- Television drama
- Directed by: Mamoru Hoshi; Masataka Takamaru
- Produced by: Yukiko Yanagawa
- Written by: Shin Ogawa
- Music by: Toshihiko Sahashi
- Studio: Kyodo Television
- Original network: FNS (Fuji TV)
- Original run: August 10, 2013 – September 28, 2013
- Episodes: 8
- Original animation DVD
- Directed by: Tomoki Takuno
- Written by: Michiko Yokote
- Music by: Masaru Yokoyama
- Studio: Liden Films
- Released: December 17, 2014 – May 15, 2015
- Runtime: 30 minutes
- Episodes: 2
- Anime television series
- Directed by: Tomoki Takuno
- Written by: Michiko Yokote
- Music by: Masaru Yokoyama
- Studio: Liden Films
- Licensed by: Crunchyroll; SA/SEA: Medialink
- Original network: Tokyo MX, ytv, TVA, TVQ, TVh, RNC, BS11
- Original run: April 12, 2015 – June 28, 2015
- Episodes: 12
- Original video animation

Yankee-kun na Yamada-kun to Megane-chan to Majo
- Directed by: Tomoki Takuno
- Written by: Michiko Yokote
- Music by: Masaru Yokoyama
- Studio: Liden Films
- Released: August 28, 2015
- Runtime: 7 minutes
- icon

Yamada-kun and the Seven Witches (Japanese: 山田くんと7人の魔女, Hepburn: Yamada-kun to Nananin no Majo) is a Japanese manga series written and illustrated by Miki Yoshikawa. It was serialized in Kodansha's shōnen manga magazine Weekly Shōnen Magazine from February 2012 to February 2017, with its chapters collected in 28 tankōbon volumes. The series was published digitally in English by Crunchyroll starting in 2013 and was licensed in North America by Kodansha USA in 2015.

An eight-episode television drama adaptation was broadcast on Fuji TV from August to September 2013. A 12-episode anime television series adaptation by Liden Films was broadcast from April to June 2015.

== Plot ==
Ryu Yamada is known as a delinquent in his high school. He has been bored with his classes after one year of attending school. One day, he accidentally falls from a flight of stairs onto Urara Shiraishi, the ace student at the school. Yamada wakes up to find he has swapped bodies with her. The two try to reverse the change and discover kissing triggers the body swap. On the suggestion of student council vice-president Toranosuke Miyamura, they revive the Supernatural Studies club. The supernatural phenomenon–obsessed Miyabi Itou soon joins the club. The club encounters other "witches" (Note: Both the Japanese term majo (魔女; literally "magical female") and the English term witch are used gender-neutrally.) with different powers are activated with a kiss on the lips. A transfer student, Kentaro Tsubaki, becomes a part of the club after nearly causing a fire to the old schoolhouse. Upon discovering the identity of the seventh witch, Rika Saionji, Yamada supposedly has his memories of the witches erased, but it instead affects the witches and the students involved. While the student council tries to impede his progress, Yamada restores the memories of the witches with a kiss, and gathers the seven witches (Note: "Seven witches" does not mean actual and only seven witches, but one batch of seven. There are two known batches, totaling 14 witches.) for a ceremony where he wishes for the powers to go away. He confesses his love to Urara and they become a couple.

He is recruited to the new student council where he learns he still has his witch copying power, but there are more witches. Although the student council tries to shield each other from the powers while discovering and allying with the witches, they find themselves facing opposition from students controlled by the Shogi (japanese chess) club, which has male students with new kinds of witch powers. The student council receives a vote of no confidence and must face a recall election. In the process of infiltrating the Japanese chess club, Yamada learns of a witch who was connected to his past. He works a deal with childhood friend-turned-rival Ushio Igarashi where he wishes for his memories to return; in exchange, Ushio would take seventh witch Nancy's ability. When the Japanese chess club continues to manipulate the campaign, Yamada uses his copied seventh witch power to erase the recent events, but Ushio beats him to the punch and they are both forgotten by the students.

Yamada returns to the Supernatural Studies club as the school has to deal with new witches following the new school year. He also learns there are gaps in his and his schoolmates' memories of what happened at the end of his first school year, including those of whom he was dating at the time. Yamada then tries to find out the truth of what happened. He ultimately gathers the male witches to hold a ceremony to restore everyone's memories. As he goes through his senior year of high school, he plans to apply to a prestigious university. However, when Urara suddenly disappears from his life along with the witches powers and everyone else's memories of her, Yamada discovers she was the original witch. Urara had agreed to the witch powers in order to have a relationship with Yamada, but on the condition her memories of him to be erased again when she leaves school. However, when she returns at graduation, Yamada finds a way to get her to remember again.

Ten years later, Yamada has become a successful businessman who is looked up to by his coworkers and keeps in touch with his high school friends, but has yet to propose to Urara. The two get married and some years later, share their story with their two children.

== Production ==
Manga author Miki Yoshikawa's previous work, Flunk Punk Rumble (Yankee-kun to Megane-chan) ran in Kodansha's Weekly Shōnen Magazine from 2006 to 2011, with a total of 211 chapters. Her editor suggested for her next project that she write a one-shot for Bessatsu Shōnen Magazine. She developed two stories: a prototype story for Yamada-kun and The Demon's Classroom. The second story was initially chosen, but became difficult to run because the main character was a grade school girl. The prototype Yamada story eventually became the first chapter for Yamada-kun.

In the Comic Natalie interview, Yoshikawa said that she had thought of the body swapping idea in the Yankee-kun days, and had researched some medical books on the differences between men and women, both physically and emotionally, but generally went with it because she liked the idea. "It just kind of came to me, but I was wondering how a guy finding himself in a girl's body would react, and the reverse". She treats a body-swapped character as an entirely different character. At Anime Expo 2015, she said that she initially thought about gender swapping first but later rejected that as a potential magic power.

When it was noted that the main characters for both of her works were delinquents, Yoshikawa replied that those types of characters came easily for her, as she grew up in the lower end of Tokyo. The characters and their names are not based on her friends so that they can act crazy. At Anime Expo 2015, she said that the characters reflect different aspects of herself. She also said that the Yamada-kun characters go to a different school from the ones in Yankee-kun but that they live in adjacent neighborhoods.

With regard to drawing, she tries to vary each kiss, but mostly uses the side angle to make sure it comes through. With regard to kisses between members of the same gender, she replied that was not intended to target any specific demographic but just "an inevitable outcome". At the time of Anime Expo, she said she had five assistants. She does her drawing by hand in black-and-white, and uses the computer for the filling in colors. She spends about half of her time on story, and the other half on actual drawing.

== Media ==
=== Manga ===
Written and illustrated by Miki Yoshikawa, Yamada-kun and the Seven Witches was serialized in Kodansha's shōnen manga magazine Weekly Shōnen Magazine from February 22, 2012, to February 22, 2017, after running for exactly 5 years. Kodansha collected its chapters in 28 tankōbon volumes, released from June 15, 2012, to April 17, 2017.

On October 26, 2013, Crunchyroll announced a partnership with Kodansha where it would distribute chapters digitally to 170 countries using a new service called Crunchyroll Manga. This includes an English translated version. The series is licensed for a North American release by Kodansha USA, who began releasing the series in 2015. In July 2015, Yoshikawa attended Anime Expo as a guest of honor where she promoted her series.

=== Television drama ===
A live-action drama aired from August 10 to September 28, 2013. It stars Yusuke Yamamoto as the title character Ryū Yamada, and Mariya Nishiuchi as Urara Shiraishi. Its theme song is "Time Machine Nante Iranai" by former AKB48 headliner Atsuko Maeda. She described the song as "cheerful and fun" and hopes it will liven up the show. Sponsors include Samsung, which included the show's characters in their related commercials broadcast at the time.

==== Episodes ====
The average rating for the series was 6.3%.

| No. | Title | Directed by | Original release date | Rating |
|---|---|---|---|---|
| 1 | "Turnover" "Irekawari" (イレカワリ) | Mamoru Hoshi | August 10, 2013 | 6.9% |
Ryū Yamada has a hard time at school, with lousy grades and being bored. He notices model student Urara Shiraishi as she climbs the stairs. He walks past her, but then slips and crashes into her. When he wakes up, he finds himself in her body! Yamada goes through the rest of the day as a girl, and discovers that Urara has been a victim of bullying, which he remedies. The two try to change back and discover that it was not the collision that causes the body swap but a kiss. Later on, Yamada has to pass a midterm, so he swaps with Shiraishi again, just in time for the girls' P.E. class. As Yamada (as Shiraishi) undresses, a stalker takes a picture, so he follows him and beats down the stalkers. Toranosuke Miyamura, the student council vice president, discovers the two's secret and revives the Supernatural Studies Club.
| 2 | "Tricot" "Toriko" (トリコ) | Mamoru Hoshi | August 17, 2013 | 7.3% |
When he receives a kiss from vice-president Nene Odagiri, Yamada discovers that he has not swapped bodies. He and Miyamura try to confirm this by kissing when Miyabi Itō arrives, much to their embarrassment. The guys explain that it is an initiation for the club, so Ito surprisingly kisses Yamada. Later Miyamura and Ito find themselves idolizing and fawning over Yamada. Ito takes Yamada to a closed-off room, but they learn from Odagiri who is with Ushio Igarashi that there is a captivation power that is the cause of this. Back at their club room they experiment and learn that Yamada has the ability to copy the power. Igarashi arrives and asks for Yamada's help to kiss Odagiri as she has fallen in love with Yamada.
| 3 | "Telepathy" "Terepashī" (テレパシー) | Masataka Takamaru | August 24, 2013 | 5.2% |
At supplementary class, Yamada meets Meiko Ōtsuka, a bespectacled girl who draws manga, and determines that she is a witch when she kisses him and does not swap bodies. Yamada shares the power with Miyamura and Ito, and discovers it is telepathy. They can hear Otsuka's thoughts as well as that of her dog, who is a pomeranian that has been styled to look like a Shiba Inu. Otsuka tells the gang she wants to pass the math exam so she can follow her father's footsteps in becoming a doctor, but Yamada learns she really wants to become a manga artist. The club agrees to help, but during the test, Yamada gets really sick from some cookies Otsuka baked and ruins their chances. Yamada interrupts Otsuka's meeting with her mother at an academic counseling session so that Otsuka can reveal her true aspirations.
| 4 | "Trauma" "Torauma" (トラウマ) | Mamoru Hoshi | August 31, 2013 | 5.7% |
Yamada tries to kiss Noa Takigawa but is rejected. They learn that she is a former child actor. They tail her and her associates, but are unable to discover anything. When the council receives reports involving students being pelted with paint balloons, Yamada tries to tail Noa as she may be the next victim. After he kicks off a balloon, he and the club capture Noa's three associates. Noa kisses Yamada, who learns that her power is to discover someone's past trauma. While resolving Noa's issues with her past, Yamada realizes he should reconcile with Ushio regarding their broken friendship.
| 5 | "Miraitoushi" (ミライトウシ) | Masataka Takamaru | September 7, 2013 | 6.9% |
Yamada quickly learns that Maria Sarushima is a witch whose power is to see a glimpse someone's future when she kisses someone. He and the club go on a summer beach trip, but Yamada has beach cleaning duties there. Maria explains her situation to Yamada and friends but when she accidentally kisses him, she and Yamada get a vision of Shiraishi lying prone on the floor at the bottom of some stairs with a pool of blood, so Yamada rushes everyone home. They try to prevent the accident from happening, but the vision does not change, and more things begin to fall into place.
| 6 | "Invisible Man" "Tōmei ningen" (トウメイ人間) | Mamoru Hoshi | September 14, 2013 | 6.3% |
Yamada learns of a "witch killer", that is, someone who can take away a witch's power. He tries to get further information from the student council president Haruma Yamazaki, but his secretary, Mikoto Asuka captures and ties Yamada up. He learns that Asuka is a witch who becomes invisible to whomever she kisses. Shiraishi and Itō talk with Asuka and learn about her background: that she does not like being stared at by guys, so she learns martial arts. Meanwhile, Miyamura distracts Yamazaki so that Yamada can check the office for the notebook. When student council exec Isobe arrives, Yamada swaps places with him. They learn that Yamazaki likes Asuka because she is willing to do anything for him. When told this, Asuka sneaks a kiss on Yamazaki but they discover she does not turn invisible to him, which makes him the witch killer. After an inadvertent kiss by Sarushima, Yamada gets a vision where Shiraishi sadly follows Isobe; he freaks out when he realizes he is in love with her.
| 7 | "Memory Operation" "Kiokusousa" (キオクソウサ) | Masataka Takamaru | September 21, 2013 | 6.6% |
Ito and Shiraishi come across an embarrassing picture on Miyamura's phone. Ito suspects that he is a double agent. Yamazaki reveals that he will select his successor by whoever can bring him the seventh witch. Yamada and Shiraishi try a body swap to get information from Miyamura but it does not work as he can easily see through it. Miyamura later reveals the truth behind his participation in the club: his sister Leona had her memories erased by the seventh witch, who happens to be a girl that Shiriashi encounters Rika Saionji. Rika explains that she and Leona used to be friends and discovered the notebooks concerning the witches, but when she kisses Leona, she makes her forget. She agrees to help the club, and reveals the ripped page from the volume. Yamada and the gang learn that there is a ritual when all seven witches are gathered, but the data is in the final volume, which is mysteriously delivered to their club, swiped from the president's desk.
| 8 | "Witch sealed" "Majo fūin" (魔女封印) | Mamoru Hoshi | September 28, 2013 | 5.5% |
Yamada and the club try to gather the seven witch girls in order to conduct the ritual that will grant them a wish. At first, only half of the girls agree to do it, but the others eventually join. During the actual ritual, Saionji feels chilly and wishes for panties, but that becomes the final wish, and that they will not have another chance until the next year. They come up with an idea: Yamada can get the witch killing power by kissing the president, and cancel all the powers. However when he kisses Saionji, he will forget everything concerning the witches. He decides to do it anyway. Shiraishi feels sad that he does not remember but realizes she loves him so she confesses to him. He ignores her but she follows him and they fall down the stairs. Yamada begins to remember and finds Shiraishi and they kiss.

=== Anime ===
An animated promotional video (PV) was released by Liden Films on August 26, 2013. The video was directed by Seiki Takuno. Ryu Yamada was voiced by Ryōta Ōsaka, and Urara Shiraishi was voiced by Saori Hayami.^{Ch. 74 interview} In June 2014, Liden Films launched a website with news that it would be producing an original anime DVD (OAD). The OAD has two installments: the first was released on December 17, 2014, bundled with the manga volume 15, and the second is bundled with volume 17 for May 15, 2015. They were advertised as featuring all seven witches as well as hot springs scenes.

In November 2014, Liden films announced plans to produce a TV anime series with the voice characters to reprise their roles from the OAD project. The series was directed by Tomoki Takuno, with Fumiaki Usui serving as assistant director. The series writer is Michiko Yokote, and the chief animation director and character designer is Eriko Iida. Yota Tsuruoka served as sound director and the music was composed by Masaru Yokoyama.

A 12-episode anime television adaptation produced by Liden Films and directed by Tomoki Takuno aired in Japan between April 12 and June 28, 2015. The opening theme song is "Kuchizuke Diamond" (くちづけDiamond) by WEAVER and the ending theme song is "CANDY MAGIC" by Mimi Meme Mimi.

The first DVD and Blu-ray Disc box sets of the anime television series included a crossover anime short Yamada-kun to 7-nin no Majo x Yankee-kun to Megane-chan adapted from the manga by the same author.

Crunchyroll released the series on Blu-ray and DVD with an English dub. Funimation later released on home video in July 2017. Medialink holds the license to the series in Southeast Asia and South Asia.

==== OAD ====
| No. | Title | Original release date |
|---|---|---|
| OAD–1 | "Second Coming of the Suzaku Fest: A Hot Springs Resort! Everyone Gather Up!" "Mō hitotsu no Suzaku-sai onsen gasshukuda yo! ? Zen'in shūgō!" (もうひとつの朱雀祭 温泉合宿だよ!? 全員集合ッ!) | December 17, 2014 |
| OAD–2 | "Another of the Suzaku Festival: Sing! Dance! Supernatural Studies Club!" "Mō hitotsu no Suzaku-sai utae! Odore! Chōjō genshō kenkyū-bu!" (もうひとつの朱雀祭 歌え！踊れ！超常現象研究部！) | May 15, 2015 |

==== Episodes ====
| No. | Title | Original release date |
|---|---|---|
| 1 | "I've Turned into Her!" "Aitsu ni nattenja nee ka!" (アイツになってんじゃねーかぁぁッ!) | April 12, 2015 |
Ryū Yamada has a hard time at school, with his slacking and a reputation of being a delinquent. He notices model student Urara Shiraishi as she climbs the stairs. He walks past her but slips and crashes into her. When he wakes up, he finds himself in her body. They agree to spend the rest of the school day in their swapped bodies. Yamada discovers Urara has been a victim of bullying, which he remedies by accidentally punching Urara which gives Rin Sasaki, the bully the image that Yamada is scared of Urara which scares Sasaki away, never to bully her again. The two try to change back and discover that it was not the collision causing the body swap but a kiss. Toranosuke Miyamura, the student council vice president, offers to go on a date with Urara while body-swapped, and reveals that he knows the two's secret. They discover Yamada and Toranosuke can switch bodies with a kiss. He revives the Supernatural Studies Club. Classmate Miyabi Ito arrives and wants to join the club.
| 2 | "Kiss Me, Okay?" "Ore to kisu-shina" (俺とキスしな) | April 19, 2015 |
Miyabi Ito joins the Supernatural Studies Club, and shows off her paranormal collection. She has the gang help clean up the room. Yamada wants to switch bodies so Urara can take his supplementary exams, but Miyabi interrupts and discovers the two kissing. Miyabi spreads rumors the two are a couple. Yamada kisses Miyabi and swaps bodies, but as he tries to retract the rumors, he discovers no one believes her gossip anyway. They discover Miyabi owed money to some bullies for the paranormal stuff and tried to fight them as Yamada. After saving Miyabi, they have her join the club where they try some more kissing experiments. The student council decides to watch over the club as a potential problem.
| 3 | "Will You Accept? Or Won't You?" "Ukeru? Soretomo Ukenai?" (受ける？それとも受けない？) | April 26, 2015 |
Yamada and Miyamura ask the student council president Haruma Yamazaki to give them a budget for the Supernatural Studies Club, but have no luck, even when they body swapped with the girls. Yamazaki proposes he would consider it if they can successfully convince Urara to go to college. When Urara swaps with Yamada at school, Yamada discovers her body has a cold, so Yamada and the other club members go to Urara's home and her room. When Urara returns home and they swap back, Yamada mentions he is having more fun at school because of her, and he might go to college. Urara agrees to go.
| 4 | "It Looks Like I've Fallen For Yamada!" "Yamada no koto ga suki ni natta mitai!" (山田のことが好きになったみたい！) | May 3, 2015 |
At the school camping trip, Yamada and Urara swap places so she can stay in the sleeping quarters and study. After spending the day with their classmates as Urara, Yamada learns she is becoming more social with them, and swaps back so she does not miss it for studying. The school's other vice president Nene Odagiri confronts Yamada about sneaking into the girls' rooms and threatens to share the pictures of him looking at Urara's underwear unless Urara misses an upcoming mock exam to ruin Toranosuke's chances on becoming council president. Although Urara does not mind skipping the mock exam, Yamada later gets Nene to kiss him with hopes he can body swap and delete the pictures. When the swap does not happen, Yamada wonders if he was lost his powers, so Miyabi and Toranosuke kiss him. The next day, Yamada is shocked to see Toranosuke and Miyabi falling in love with him, but kissing them again restores them to normal. He realizes he acquired the power to attract people from Nene.
| 5 | "You Mustn't Kiss Her, Okay?" "Kisu Shicha Dame yo?" (キスしちゃダメよ？) | May 10, 2015 |
Urara wants to body swap, but Yamada tries to postpone it. He eventually tells Urara about his different power, but Urara kisses him and they body swap. They discover Yamada has gain the ability to copy a witch's power, and Urara has the body swapping power. Nene, who has been watching this, gets extremely flustered, realizing she has fallen for Yamada because of her own spell. Yamada shares the back story of how he and Ushio were buddies in middle school, and how they had a fall out during high school when a fight with some delinquents which got Yamada suspended for a week. Ushio gets the pictures deleted and begs Yamada to change Nene back to normal, and they settle their grudge. The club gets an old notebook noting there are seven witches with different powers, and the second volume is missing.
| 6 | "Respond!" "Ōtō seyo !" (応答せよっ！) | May 17, 2015 |
The Supernatural Studies Club have some summer fun at the beach, except for Yamada, who must take supplementary classes nearby. When Urara body swaps to ace one of the sessions, supplementary classmate Meiko Otsuka tries to befriend him and kisses him. But when nothing happens, the club reasons Meiko must be a witch. In order to get access to the old club room, Yamada and his summer classmates must pass the exam. Yamada kisses Meiko and learns her witch power is telepathy. They use it to pass the exam, and the club room is emptied. They decide they will look for more witches on their own.
| 7 | "Anything but Tempura!" "Tenpura dake wa yamete kure!" (天ぷらだけはやめてくれぇ！) | May 24, 2015 |
The club learns from Meiko there's a fourth witch, Maria Sarushima, who has been absent from school. Yamada and Toranosuke visit Maria, who reveals to Yamada she has the ability to see the short-term future, and she had a vision the old school would be burned down and they would be blamed for it. She had tried to prevent this by staying away from the school, however circumstances have changed. There was also a guy she had kissed named Kentaro Tsubaki who might be connected to the vision. Yamada discovers Kentaro has a crush on Urara and he likes to fry tempura in the old building. The club tries to set Kentaro up to go shopping with Yamada pretending to be Urara night of the supposed fire; however, the vision has not really changed. Kentaro confesses to Urara only to be boldly rejected when Yamada arrives and kisses him. He flees to the old classroom and is about to turn on the burner, however, Yamada and Urara arrive in time to stop him. Kentaro later joins the club.
| 8 | "You're So Annoying" "Chō Uzain'dakedo" (超ウザイんだけど) | May 31, 2015 |
The club is tasked to stop a group of underclassmen who have been causing trouble. The gang is led by Noa Takigawa, who has the ability to see someone's past weakness. Yamada tries to convince Noa to stop doing what she is doing but fails. When the club room is trashed by Noa's lackeys and their notebook stolen, they learn from Yamazaki Noa plans to eradicate the witches to rid their powers so the powers can go to Noa's friends. They capture Noa's friends and try to get Noa to back down. Although Noa refuses, her friends eventually persuade her to let it go. When Yamada questions Noa's true motives, Noa kisses Yamada and reveals the truth of her past trauma. Yamada helps Noa and her friends clear their names.
| 9 | "I'll Definitely Change the Future" "Kanarazu Mirai wo Kaete" (必ず未来を変えて) | June 7, 2015 |
During the school festival, Maria Sarushima asks Yamada if there's a way to get her power erased. Yamada meets Shinichi Tamaki, who can do just that, but he currently is holding the ability to turn invisible to whomever he kisses. He agrees to erase Maria's ability if he can become student council president. Yamada tries to ask Haruma who he will choose as his successor, but he refuses to answer. Haruma proposes a contest instead: whichever team can tell him the name of the seventh witch can have their candidate become president. When Maria inadvertently kisses Yamada to thank him, Yamada gets a vision of Tamaki as president, and Urara is his secretary and she looks sad. Yamada tries to support Toranosuke to help look for the seventh witch.
| 10 | "Please Go Out With Me" "Ore to tsukiatte kudasai" (俺と付き合ってください) | June 14, 2015 |
Yamada and his colleagues, who are looking for the seventh witch, meet Miyamura's older sister, Leona. Leona refused to attend school to escape the witch's "memory loss" ability. The moment he learns the name of the seventh witch, all memories of the witch will be erased. That means I forget about Shiraishi! ?? Still, Yamada decides to say, "It's no big deal at all!" and hears the name of the seventh witch from Leona. Yamada, who chose to change the future for Urara, asks his colleagues in the Supernatural club to "pull me back" and tells Yamazaki the name of the witch!
| 11 | "What did you do with Shiraishi" "Anata wa Shiraishi de nani o shimashita" (あなたは白石で何をしました) | June 21, 2015 |
Seeing Urara in tears, Yamada cannot help but kiss her to prove she is a witch, but Urara rejects him. Yamada and Tamaki look for a way to regain their friend's memories without giving up. Nene has regained her memory! The witch who kisses Yamada can regain their memory! ?? Rika Saionji, who reappears in front of Yamada, begins to talk about why those who knew the names of all seven witches were erased. What!, if all the witches are together, any wish will come true!
| 12 | "I Love You, Shiraishi!" "Ore wa Shiraishi ga sukida!" (俺は白石が好きだ！) | June 28, 2015 |
Yamada and his friends have to bring all seven witches together to perform the witch ritual. There are three people left, Urara, Mikoto Asuka, and Rika. Yamada, who wants to save Urara anyway, tries to go to Mikoto's house with Miyamura, the club president, but is stopped by his sister Leona Miyamura. Leona tells Yamada, who is impatient about the situation, that he should persuade Rika first, rather than Urara. Rika offers a trade-off to bring Leona to school instead of attending the ritual. Leona reminisces she was a member of the Supernatural Studies Club with Haruma Yamazaki, and while exploring the legend of the witch, Yamazaki's memory was erased. Leona then fled from Suzaku High School and Rika plans to still run away from her.

== Reception ==
By February 2017, the manga had sold over 3.85 million copies in Japan.

== Works cited ==
- "Ch." is shortened form for chapter and refers to a chapter number of the Yamada-kun and the Seven Witches manga by Miki Yoshikawa. Original Japanese version published by Kodansha. English version published by Crunchyroll Manga.
- 山田くんと7人の魔女 — スポニチ (Yamada-kun and the Seven Witches) drama, 2013, 8 episodes. (in Japanese)
