= List of Flunk Punk Rumble volumes =

Flunk Punk Rumble, known in Japan as Yankee-kun to Megane-chan (ヤンキー君とメガネちゃん, Yankī-kun to Megane-chan) is a manga series written and illustrated by Miki Yoshikawa. The series began as a three-part short story that was later developed into a full series and serialized in Kodansha's Weekly Shōnen Magazine starting October 18, 2006. It ended on May 18, 2011, with a total of 211 chapters.

No.	Original release date	Original ISBN	English release date	English ISBN
1	February 16, 2007	978-4-06-363799-1	March 04, 2008	978-981-276-416-4
2	April 04, 2007	978-4-06-363825-7	August 12, 2008	978-981-276-480-5
3	June 15, 2007	978-4-06-363846-2	January 20, 2009	978-981-276-759-2
4	September 08, 2007	978-4-06-363871-4	—	—
5	November 16, 2007	978-4-06-363917-9	—	—
6	January 17, 2008	978-4-06-363943-8	—	—
7	April 17, 2008	978-4-06-363976-6	—	—
8	June 17, 2008	978-4-06-384006-3	—	—
9	September 17, 2008	978-4-06-384043-8	—	—
10	November 17, 2008	978-4-06-384067-4	—	—
11	February 17, 2009	978-4-06-384101-5	—	—
12	April 17, 2009	978-4-06-384123-7	—	—
13	July 17, 2009	978-4-06-384160-2	—	—
14	October 16, 2009	978-4-06-384186-2	—	—
15	January 15, 2010	978-4-06-384236-4	—	—
16	March 17, 2010	978-4-06-384268-5	—	—
17	May 17, 2010	978-4-06-384298-2	—	—
18	June 17, 2010	978-4-06-384313-2	—	—
19	September 17, 2010	978-4-06-384363-7	—	—
20	November 17, 2010	978-4-06-384397-2	—	—
21	January 17, 2011	978-4-06-384427-6	—	—
22	April 15, 2011	978-4-06-384475-7	—	—
23	June 17, 2011	978-4-06-384505-1	—	—
