= A Couple of Cuckoos =

Japanese manga series and its adaptations

- First tankōbon volume cover, featuring Nagi Umino (left) and Erika Amano (right)

カッコウの許嫁 (Kakkō no Iinazuke)
- Genre: Harem; Romantic comedy
- Manga
- Written by: Miki Yoshikawa
- Published by: Kodansha
- English publisher: NA: Kodansha USA
- Imprint: Shōnen Magazine Comics
- Magazine: Weekly Shōnen Magazine
- Original run: January 29, 2020 – present
- Volumes: 34
- Anime television series
- Directed by: Hiroaki Akagi (Note: Chief director (総監督)) (S1); Yoshiyuki Shirahata (S1); Masakazu Hishida (S2)
- Produced by: Motomichi Araki; Nobuhiko Kurosu; Yuuki Mori; Kou Tachibana; Nobuaki Takahashi
- Written by: Yasuhiro Nakanishi (S1); Masakazu Hishida (Note: Masakazu Hishida is credited for series composition under the alias Jō Aoba (青葉 譲, Aoba Jō).) (S2)
- Music by: Rei Ishizuka
- Studio: Shin-Ei Animation (S1); SynergySP (S1); Okuruto Noboru (S2)
- Licensed by: Crunchyroll
- Original network: ANN (TV Asahi) (S1); Tokyo MX, BS NTV, KBS Kyoto, Sun TV (S2)
- English network: US: Crunchyroll Channel
- Original run: April 24, 2022 – September 23, 2025
- Episodes: 36
- icon

A Couple of Cuckoos (Japanese: カッコウの許嫁, Hepburn: Kakkō no Iinazuke; "Cuckoo's Fiancé(e)") is a Japanese manga series written and illustrated by Miki Yoshikawa. It was originally published as a one-shot in September 2019, before beginning serialization in Kodansha's Weekly Shōnen Magazine in January 2020. An anime television series adaptation produced by Shin-Ei Animation and SynergySP aired from April to October 2022. A second season produced by Okuruto Noboru aired from July to September 2025.

== Plot ==
Nagi Umino is a 16-year-old second-year high school student who learns that he is not the biological child of the family that raised him. On the way to his first meeting with his biological family, he meets Erika Amano, a popular internet celebrity who is trying to escape from an arranged marriage. Later, Nagi and Erika discover that the hospital had accidentally switched the two after their births and their parents are now aiming to put them in an arranged marriage; so they, selfishly, do not have to say goodbye to the children they raised after missing out of their respective childhoods. To facilitate this, they are made to live in a house owned by Erika's family; hoping the two will fall in love before graduation, but will respect their wishes to abandon the idea if nothing comes of it.

== Characters ==
Nagi Umino (海野 凪, Umino Nagi)
Voiced by: Yuma Uchida (PV), Kaito Ishikawa (anime) (Japanese); Nicholas Andrew Louie (English)
A second-year student at Megurogawa Academy, who is ranked second in his grade. He is the biological son of a hotel tycoon, but due to a mix-up after his birth is raised by a different family. He has a crush on his classmate Hiro Segawa and aims to confess to her once he beats her in the school rankings. Following a challenge which he won, he starts dating Hiro. However, he starts to develop feelings toward Erika after realizing he hurt her by choosing Hiro. It is later revealed that his older brother Sōsuke deliberately switched Nagi and Erika in the hospital to let Nagi avoid suffering from high expectations as a son of the Amano family.
Erika Amano (天野 エリカ, Amano Erika)
Voiced by: Maaya Uchida (PV), Akari Kitō (anime) (Japanese); Lindsay Sheppard (English)
A popular Instagram celebrity who is the biological daughter of the family that raised Nagi. She first meets him while taking videos at a park, and makes him pretend to be her boyfriend to escape from an arranged marriage, unaware that her parents arranged for her to be engaged to Nagi and for them to live together in a single house. After her school discovers the pictures she took with him, she is forced to transfer to Nagi's school. She decided to start an Instagram account in order to reach someone she had been looking for. Though she initially had no romantic feelings or interest in him, Erika later on realizes she really is in love with Nagi, as she is hurt when he chooses Hiro instead of her. She nevertheless continues to have feelings for Nagi's biological older brother Sōsuke, the person she was originally searching for.
Sachi Umino (海野 幸, Umino Sachi)
Voiced by: Konomi Kohara (anime) (Japanese); Bryn Apprill (English)
Nagi's adoptive sister and Erika's biological sister. She is scared that Nagi will leave her, and later she runs away from home and moves to the house where Nagi and Erika are staying. Later on in the series, she decides to aim for enrolling in Nagi and Erika's school after graduating from junior high school. She also has feelings for Nagi, which grew after she learned they are not blood-related.
Hiro Segawa (瀬川 ひろ, Segawa Hiro)
Voiced by: Nao Tōyama (anime) (Japanese); AmaLee (English)
Nagi's classmate who is ranked first in her grade. She lives in a temple and works as a miko. She later becomes friends with Erika. It is revealed that she is also engaged to someone else. Though she wants Nagi to get together with Erika, it is suggested that she has developed feelings for Nagi as well. She sometimes shows yandere tendencies towards Nagi.
Ai Mochizuki (望月 あい, Mochizuki Ai)
Voiced by: Hina Yōmiya (anime) (Japanese); Bao the Whale (English)
Nagi's childhood friend, who moved to China as a child due to her father's work, and returns to Japan for Nagi. She is also a popular online singer. She has loved Nagi since childhood, to the point of decorating her room with pictures of him. She sometimes wears T-shirts with Nagi's face on them.
Yōhei Umino (海野 洋平, Umino Yōhei)
Voiced by: Ryōhei Kimura (anime) (Japanese); Gianni Matragrano (English)
Nagi's adoptive father. Erika and Sachi's biological father. He and his wife Namie run a restaurant together.
Namie Umino (海野 奈美恵, Umino Namie)
Voiced by: Yoko Hikasa (anime) (Japanese); Marissa Lenti (English)
Nagi's adoptive mother. Erika and Sachi's biological mother. She and her husband Yōhei run a restaurant together.
Sōichirō Amano (天野 宗一郎, Amano Sōichirō)
Voiced by: Toshiyuki Morikawa (anime) (Japanese); David J. Dixon (English)
Erika's adoptive father. Nagi's biological father. He is the owner of a hotel chain.
Ritsuko Amano (天野 律子, Amano Ritsuko)
Voiced by: Yukiko Aruga (anime) (Japanese); Monica Rial (English)
Erika's adoptive mother. Nagi's biological mother. She works as a television producer.
Shion Asuma (遊馬 シオン, Asuma Shion)
Voiced by: Yoshitsugu Matsuoka (anime) (Japanese); Brendan Blaber (English)
Sōsuke Amano (天野 宗助, Amano Sōsuke)
Erika's adoptive older brother and Nagi's biological older brother. He was primed to take over the Amano family business, but became overwhelmed by the family's expectations. Despite being happy to have a younger brother, he switches him and Erika in the hospital to prevent Nagi from sharing his fate.

== Production ==
A Couple of Cuckoos is the first manga series in which Miki Yoshikawa uses digital drawing.

== Media ==
=== Manga ===
Miki Yoshikawa first published the series as a one-shot in Weekly Shōnen Magazine in September 2019, as part of a promotion in which she would publish three one-shots and readers could vote on which would receive a serialization. The series began serialization in Weekly Shōnen Magazine on January 29, 2020. The first tankōbon volume was released on May 15, 2020. A promotional video for the series was released on June 11, 2020. The video was voiced by Yuma Uchida and Maaya Uchida, who are siblings. The series entered its final arc on January 28, 2026. As of September 2026, thirty-four volumes have been released.

The series is licensed in digital format in North America by Kodansha USA.

==== Volumes ====
No.	Original release date	Original ISBN	English release date	English ISBN
1	May 15, 2020	978-4-06-519380-8	January 12, 2021	978-1-64-659893-9
1. Be My Boyfriend! (私(わたし)の彼(かれ)氏(し)になりなさいよ!, Watashi no kareshi ni narinasai yo!); 2. I Won't Marry You (結婚(けっこん)ならしないわよ?, Kekkon nara shinai wa yo?); 3. We'll Have Nothing to Do with Each Other (お互(たが)い一切関(いっさいかん)与(よ)しないこと, Otagai issai kanyo shinai koto); 4. I'll Never Lose to You!!! (絶対(ぜったい)に負(ま)けないから!!!!, Zettai ni makenai kara!!!!); 5. Are You an idiot?! (バカなんじゃないの!?, Baka nan janai no!?); 6. Will You Please Be My Girlfriend...? (俺(おれ)と付(つ)き合(あ)ってくれますか...?, Ore to tsukiatte kuremasu ka...?)
2	July 17, 2020	978-4-06-519380-8	February 9, 2021	978-1-64-659985-1
7. Thank You for Taking Care of Me! (どうもお世話(せわ)になりました!!, Doumo osewa ni narimashita!!); 8. You Two Look Identical...! (お前(まえ)らホントそっくりだよな...!, Omaera honto sokkuri dayo na...!); 9. Can We Study Together in the Morning...? (一緒(いっしょ)に朝活(あさかつ)できるかな...?, Issho ni asakatsu dekiru kana...?); 10. I Guess You Do Have a Good Side (ちょっとはいい所(ところ)あるじゃん, Chotto wa ī tokoro aru jan!); 11. You Two Make a Good Pair (二人(ふたり)ってお似合(にあ)いじゃない...?, Futari tte oniai janai...?); 12. You Live Alone, Right? (一人(ひとり)で住(す)んでるんだよね?, Hitori de sunderu n da yo ne?); 13. You Seem Like You Could Bear It (海(うみ)野(の)君(くん)なら背負(せお)ってくれそう, Umino-kun nara seotte kuresō!); 14. My Fate Might Change (私(わたし)の運命(うんめい)変(か)わっちゃうのかな?, Watashi no unmei kawatchau no kana...?); 15. Are You Worried About Those Two? (あの二人(ふたり)が気(き)になる?, Ano futari ga ki ni naru?)
3	September 17, 2020	978-4-06-520597-6	March 9, 2021	978-1-63-699002-6
16. Make Up Your Mind and Face People Head-on!! (腹(はら)を据(す)えて人(ひと)と向(む)き合(あ)うべし!!, Hara o suete hito to mukiau beshi!!); 17. Is He Going to Get Married? (このまま結婚(けっこん)しちゃうの?, Kono mama kekkon shitchau no?); 18. How Many People Have Asked You Out?! (今(いま)まで何人(なんにん)に告白(こくはく)された!?, Ima made nannin ni kokuhaku sareta!?); 19. The Kuroshio Current is Calling Me...!! (黒潮(くろしお)が俺(おれ)を呼(よ)んでるせ...!!, Kuroshio ga ore o yonderu ze...!!); 20. You Seem Like You'd Be Able to Keep Up With Me (海(うみ)野(の)君(くん)は私(わたし)についてこれそうだから, Umino-kun wa watashi ni tsuite koresou); 21. It's Disgraceful Since You're Already Engaged! (許(いい)嫁(なずけ)がいるのにハレンチだよ!, Īnazuke ga iru no ni harenchi da yo!); 22. If We're Gonna Run Away, Let's Do it Properly (やるならとことん"家(いえ)出(で)"しようぜ, Yaru nara tokoton "iede" shiyou ze!); 23. Don't Treat Me Like a Little Sister (妹(いもうと)扱(あつか)いしないでよ, Imōto atsukai shinaide yo!); 24. Pretend That Didn't Happen, Okay? (さっきのは無(な)かったことでよろしくな!, Sakki no wa nakatta koto de yoroshiku na!)
4	November 17, 2020	978-4-06-521254-7	June 29, 2021	978-1-63-699002-6
25. You're Still My Sister (妹(いもうと)なのは変(か)わらないけど, Imōto na no wa kawaranai kedo); 26. I Can't Let the Day End Here (このまま解散(かいさん)するわけにはいかない!!, Kono mama kaisan suru wake ni wa ikanai!!); 27. You Never Smile for Me (私(わたし)には笑(え)顔(がお)見(み)せないんだ?, Watashi ni wa egao misenai n’da?); 28. What Does "Like" Mean, Anyway? (そもそも好(す)きって何(なん)だ, Somosomo suki tte nan da); 29. That Doesn't Change Your Worth, Nagi-kun!! (凪(なぎ)くんの価値(かち)なんて変(か)わらないよ!!!, Nagi-kun no kachi nante kawaranai yo!!!); 30. This Isn't Going So Well (なかなかうまくいかないねぇ, Nakanaka umaku ikanai nee); 31. It's My Fate to Just Do Whatever I'm Told!! (言(い)いなりになる運命(うんめい)なのよ...!!, Iinari ni naru unmei na no yo...!!); 32. Walls Are There to Be Overcome!! (壁(かべ)は越(こ)えるためにある!!, Kabe wa koeru tame ni aru!!); 33. I'll Never Forget This Summer!! (この夏(なつ)は一(いっ)生(しょう)忘(わす)れない!!, Kono natsu wa isshō wasurenai!!)
5	January 15, 2021	978-4-06-521642-2	August 10, 2021	978-1-63-699294-5
34. We Have to Tell Our Secret (言(い)うしかない俺達(おれたち)の秘(ひ)密(みつ)...!, Iu shikanai oretachi no himitsu...!); 35. She Has a Dark Side After All! (やっぱり"裏(うら)"があるんだ...!!, Yappari "ura" ga aru n da...!!); 36. Our Whole Family is Gathered Here!! (家(か)族全員(ぞくぜんいん) 集(あつ)まってるんですから...!, Kazoku zen’in atsumatteru n desu kara...!); 37. I Have a Concern About That (そういうのどうかと思(おも)います, Sō iu no, dō ka to omoimasu...); 38. Let's Work Together (ここは協力(きょうりょく)し合(あ)おう!!!, Koko wa kyōryoku shiaou!!!); 39. It's Almost Like Anything Could Happen! (なにが起(お)きてもおかしくはないのでは!!?, Nani ga okite mo okashiku wa nai no de wa!!?); 40. I'm Glad We Met (出会(であ)えてよかったな, Deaete yokatta na); 41. You Finally Got to Go to a Training Camp, But... (せっかくの合(がっ)宿(しゅく)なのに, Sekkaku no gasshuku na no ni); 42. Who is That Person...? (その人(ひと)は誰(だれ)...?, Sono hito wa dare...?)
6	April 16, 2021	978-4-06-522522-6	March 1, 2022	978-1-63-699642-4
43. That's Why, On That Day... (だからねあの日(ひ)..., Dakara ne, ano hi...); 44. You've Realized it, Haven't You? (もう気(き)づいているんだよね?, Mō kizuite iru nda yo ne?); 45. I Wanna Be an Adult!!!! (早(はや)く大人(おとな)になりたーい!!!!, Hayaku otona ni naritaii!!!!); 46. If I Told You to Marry Me... (アタシが結婚(けっこん)してって言(い)ったら, Atashi ga kekkon shite tte ittara); 47. I Felt Like My Destiny Was Changing ("運命(うんめい)変(か)わってる"気(き)がしちやったよ, "Unmei kawatteru" ki ga shichatta yo); 48. It'll Just Be Our Secret (私(わたし)と凪(なぎ)くんだけの秘(ひ)密(みつ)じゃん, Watashi to Nagi-kun dake no himitsu jan); 49. Next Time You Do It, I'll Curse You (今(こん)度(ど)やったら呪(のろ)うからね...?, Kondo yattara norou kara ne...?); 50. There's No Such Thing as a Relationship That Doesn't Change (変(か)わらない関係(かんけい)なんてないんだよ, Kawaranai kankei nante nai n da yo); 51. Could I Have Him...? (私(わたし)がもらってもいいかな...?, Watashi ga morattemo ii kana...?)
7	July 16, 2021	978-4-06-523580-5	May 3, 2022	978-1-68-491160-8
52. I'll Be Right There with You; 53. What Should We Do Now?; 54. You're My Accomplice, Umino-kun; 55. Am I Wrong for Being Bad...?; 56. All That Matters is That You Two Are Happy; 57. I Get To Live with Hiro-chan?!; 58. Who Was Umino-kun's First Love?; 59. Why Are We All Living Together?!; 60. Let Operation: Nurse Erika-chan Begin!!
8	September 17, 2021	978-4-06-524837-9	July 5, 2022	978-1-68-491336-7
61. I'm Not Getting Married!; 62. Fate is Something You Carve Out for Yourself!!!; 63. Don't Talk to Me Again!!; 64. Do You Remember What Happened Then?; 65. You're Just No Good Without Me!; 66. Big Bro Confessed to You, Right...?; 67. Could You Walk Me Home?; 68. Who Does He Take After?!; 69. It's a Hundred Times Better Thant That
9	November 17, 2021	978-4-06-526000-5	January 24, 2023	978-1-68-491418-0
70. When Did Things Take Such a Turn...?; 71. In That Case, What Can We Conclude?!!; 72. What's Your Job, Ai-chan?; 73. Will You Proceed to the Next Stage?; 74. I've Been Walking on Air; 75. The Gang's All Here!; 76. What Kind of Cosplay Will She Do...?; 77. It Was Obviously My First Time!; 78. Why in the World is This Happening...?
10	January 17, 2022	978-4-06-526602-1	March 28, 2023	978-1-68-491540-8
79. How Was Summer Vacation?; 80. Your Life is My Life Too!; 81. I Won't Forgive the Culprit!!; 82. Like Mother, Like Daughter; 83. How Am I Supposed to Act Normal?!; 84. If You Move, I'll Get Curious and Look!!; 85. Erike Has Changed Since She Met Nagi-kun, Huh?; 86. You're Testing to See If I'm a Suitable Match, Right?; 87. You Haven't Kissed Anyone, Right, Amano-san?
11	March 17, 2022	978-4-06-527283-1	May 23, 2023	978-1-68-491626-9
88. That's "Family," Not "Romance"!!; 89. It's Something We Carve Out for Ourselves!; 90. I'll Get to See You Again After a Week, Right?!!; 91. You Really Are Cute, Umino-kun!; 92. I Want to Help Segawa-san?; 93. She Wouldn't Do That If She Hated Him!; 94. You Love This Shrine, Don't You, Segawa-san?; 95. There's No Denying Segawa-san is the Leading Lady Today; 96. I'll Be an Adult Someday
12	May 17, 2022	978-4-06-527918-2	July 25, 2023	979-8-88-933049-3
97. Our Real Enemy is Sachi-chan!!; 98. My Precious Only Sister...!!; 99. I Was Sure You Weren't My Brother; 100. I Wanted to Team Up With You, Nagi-kun; 101. I Got Too Excited...; 102. That Wasn't Me; 103. Isn't It Fun Having Four Parents?!; 104. You Want to Marry Me, Right?; 105. Oh Yeah, Nagi-kun! Let's Take a Commemorative Photo!
13	July 15, 2022	978-4-06-528431-5	September 26, 2023	979-8-88-933157-5
106. I'm Glad I Got to Go to This School with You, Nagi-kun!; 107. Team "Ami-Umi House"!; 108. I'm Sorry We Couldn't Win; 109. Your Face is Bright Red, Big Bro...; 110. Just Forget I Said That; 111. Thank You for Liking Me; 112. I Never Thought You'd Say Such a Thing, Erika; 113. I Figured You Would Understand, Umino-kun; 114. That Might Be It!
14	October 17, 2022	978-4-06-529488-8	November 21, 2023	979-8-88-933274-9
115. This is My Answer!!; 116. I Don't Want That!!; 117. I'm in Favor of You Dating!; 118. I Wanna Give it a Try, Too; 119. This is the Moment; 120. I Can Read You Like a Book; 121. It's the Same For Me; 122. It's Kinda Embarrassing; 123. I Dunnowie
15	December 16, 2022	978-4-06-529937-1; 978-4-06-530085-5 (SE)	January 30, 2024	979-8-88-933337-1
124. It Was About This, Huh...; 125. Do You... Have a Problem with This?; 126. It Cleared Up Today; 127. I'm the Princess!; 128. I Want to Answer Properly!; 129. Do You Like Her?; 130. What the Heck Am I Doing?; 131. The One by Amano-san's Side; 132. Won't You Listen to Your Girlfriend?
16	March 16, 2023	978-4-06-530628-4	March 26, 2024	979-8-88-933417-0
133. But I Still Like Him; 134. The Triangle is Complete; 135. Is It Really So Strange?; 136. You're Not Family Anymore; 137. Yeah, I Do Love Him; 138. That's What They Call "Growth"!!; 139. I Don't Want to Lose; 140. I Haven't Ever Been This Happy!!!; 141. I Might See It Someday
17	May 17, 2023	978-4-06-531584-2	May 28, 2024	979-8-88-933497-2
142. Is It Today?!!; 143. Is That Bad?; 144. It Just Proved to Me...; 145. I Think You're Right; 146. There's No Way I'll Lose...!!!; 147. To Prove My Love!!; 148. I Just Cannot Understand It!!; 149. It Means "Everything in the World"; 150. Initiative Brings Victory!!
18	August 17, 2023	978-4-06-532608-4	July 23, 2024	979-8-88-933626-6
151. I Ended Up All Alone Again...; 152. So That's How He Laughs...; 153. It Was Sooo Much Fun!!; 154. I Had No Idea...; 155. You're Just You, Nagi-kun!!; 156. That's Weird, Isn't It...?; 157. We're the Only Ones in the World...!!; 158. Hey, Umino-kun...; 159. I Got Dumped?!!
19	October 17, 2023	978-4-06-533151-4	September 24, 2024	979-8-89-478015-3
160. I'm Always on Your Side; 161. Say What You Really Mean!!!; 162. I Thought You Weren't Coming Back; 163. Like Badges of Honor to a Warrior; 164. You Got It All Wrong; 165. I'll Go and Bring Him Back...!!; 166. I Wonder If This is What It Means to Grow Up; 167. I Have a Wish for You, Big Bro...; 168. I Was Finally Able to Tell Him...!!
20	December 15, 2023	978-4-06-533885-8; 978-4-06-533942-8 (SE)	November 26, 2024	979-8-89-478166-2
169. Can We Go Back to Being Friends?; 170. When It's Time to Do Something, I Do It; 171. Maybe This is What They Call "Happiness"; 172. Hey, Big Sis Erika...; 173. You're Real Sisters Now!!; 174. It's Almost Like Us Fighting Over Big Bro...; 175. It's Almost Here...; 176. I'll Be Just Fine...!; 177. Leave It to Me!
21	February 16, 2024	978-4-06-534567-2; 978-4-06-534565-8 (SE)	January 28, 2025	979-8-89-478323-9
178. Fifty-Fifty...!!!; 179. You've Gotta Face Her; 180. I Don't Know!!!; 181. I've Never Done This Before...; 182. I Feel Like This Happened Before; 183. Thank You for Everything...!!; 184. This is the Umino Family's Problem!!; 185. Don't You Dare Underestimate the Tourist Trade; 186. Why Am I Crying?!
22	April 17, 2024	978-4-06-535176-5; 978-4-06-535174-1 (SE)	March 25, 2025	979-8-89-478434-2
187. That Was a Close One!!; 188. What About You?!!; 189. Commence Recon!!; 190. Something Troubling You?; 191. Whose Side Should I Take...?!; 192. You'd Better Hurry Up and Choose One of Them; 193. Such Beautiful Sibling Love; 194. There's Something I Wanna Show You...; 195. Even Though They're Really Related?!
23	July 17, 2024	978-4-06-536159-7; 978-4-06-536136-8 (SE)	May 27, 2025	979-8-89-478526-4
196. You Really Do Look Identical...; 197. Then We're Gonna Win This; 198. Welcome to the Nebula Villa!!; 199. Please Just Wait Five Minutes; 200. It's That Time Already?!; 201. Hop In!! I'll Take You to the Station!!; 202. I Felt Like I Didn't Want to Lose to Him; 203. I Felt Like the Only One Left Out...!!; 204. Happy Birthday, You Two!!
24	September 17, 2024	978-4-06-536771-1	July 22, 2025	979-8-89-478588-2
205. Where's the Birthday Present?!; 206. We're High School Third-Years Already...; 207. In the Seat Right in Front of Me...!!!; 208. I Don't Understand Japanese High School Girls...!!; 209. It's Like I'm Dreaming; 210. Where Do You Think We're Going for Our School Trip?; 211. Night is When It All Starts!!; 212. What I Said Earlier is True; 213. Today's a Free Day, So...
25	November 15, 2024	978-4-06-537440-5	September 23, 2025	979-8-89-478684-1
214. Where's This Boat Going?; 215. This is My Shrine; 216. So This is Meguro Shrine!; 217. Sooo Many Shrine Stamps!!; 218. If Someone Picks a Fight with You, Take 'em On!!!; 219. A Man Doesn't Go Back on His Word...!!; 220. I Need Your Advice, Big Bro...; 221. You're Cute, So That's Okay!!; 222. Today is Saturday, a Day Off
26	January 17, 2025	978-4-06-538066-6	November 18, 2025	979-8-89-478771-8
223. What Do You Mean We'll Stop Living Together...?!!; 224. Are All Families Like That?!; 225. Let's Give Up on Mommy for Now!!; 226. Is This Something an Adult Would Do...?; 227. Guess I'll Give It My Best!!; 228. I Walked Into a Love Nest...; 229. My Beloved Daughter; 230. Come Back Again Anytime...; 231. Why Don't You Go to Sleep Too, Nagi-kun?
27	April 16, 2025	978-4-06-539100-6	February 17, 2026	979-8-89-478891-3
232. It's Harder to Spend Money Than Make It; 233. Can I See You After School? I Need to Talk to You; 234. We're Going Home!!; 235. It Was Pouring Rain That Day, Too; 236. Could I Have Those Tickets?!!; 237. The Ocean! The Hot Spring Town! Awesome!; 238. You Haven't Forgotten, Right?; 239. It's Not Like You Studying Will Lead to World Peace, Either; 240. That Means This Younger Guy Has You in His Sights, Nagi-kun!!
28	June 17, 2025	978-4-06-539764-0	April 21, 2026	979-8-89-830070-8
241. I'm Not Participating in the Sports Festival Anyway!!; 242. This is What Sports Festivals Are About!; 243. It's Begun!! The Hugely Popular Scavenger Hunt Race!!; 244. We've Got a Bond, After All!!; 245. Isn't This Just Luck?!!; 246. You Were a Big Help. Thank You.; 247. Let the Obstacle Course Race Begin!!; 248. Fighting Against You Was Really Fun; 249. Nagi-kun Is In His Popular Era…?
29	August 12, 2025	978-4-06-540371-6	July 21, 2026	979-8-89-830172-9
30	November 17, 2025	978-4-06-541557-3	September 22, 2026	979-8-89-830284-9
31	January 16, 2026	978-4-06-542209-0		
32	April 16, 2026	978-4-06-543001-9	—	—
33	June 17, 2026	978-4-06-543891-6	—	—
34	September 16, 2026	978-4-06-544976-9	—	—
35	December 16, 2026	978-4-06-545716-0	—	—

=== Anime ===
In April 2021, an anime television series adaptation was announced. It is animated by Shin-Ei Animation and SynergySP and directed by Yoshiyuki Shirahata, with Hiroaki Akagi serving as chief director, Yasuhiro Nakanishi overseeing series scripts, and Aya Takano designing characters. The series aired from April 24 to October 2, 2022, on TV Asahi's NUMAnimation block. (Note: TV Asahi listed the series premiere at 25:30 on April 23, 2022, which is effectively 1:30 a.m. JST on April 24.) It aired for two consecutive cours. The first opening theme song is "Dekoboko" (凸凹; lit. 'Rough') by Kiyoe Yoshioka, vocalist of the Japanese duo Ikimonogakari, while the ending theme song is "Shikaku Unmei" (四角運命; lit. 'Square Destiny') by Sangatsu no Phantasia. The second opening theme is "Glitter" by Sumika, while the second ending theme is "Hello Hello Hello" by Eir Aoi. Crunchyroll licensed the series for worldwide streaming outside of Asia. A spin-off mini anime series titled Kakkō no Iikagen premiered on YouTube on April 28, 2022.

On April 11, 2022, Crunchyroll announced that the series would receive an English dub, which premiered on May 7. On July 10, 2022, a promotional video for the second cours starting on July 23 was released. Eir Aoi performed the new ending theme song "Hello Hello Hello".

A second season was announced in July 2024. It is produced by Okuruto Noboru and written and directed by Masakazu Hishida, with Kyoko Chika designing the characters, and Rei Ishizuka returning as the composer. The season aired from July 8 to September 23, 2025, on Tokyo MX and other channels. The opening theme song is "Kimi ga Kureta mono" (君がくれたもの; lit. 'What You Gave Me') performed by Asmi, while the ending theme song is "Anata de Nakucha" (あなたでなくちゃ; lit. 'It Has to be You') by 22/7.

==== Episodes ====
===== Season 1 =====
No.	Title (Note: All English titles are taken from Crunchyroll.)	Directed by	Written by	Storyboarded by	Original release date
1	"You're going to be my boyfriend." Transliteration: "Watashi no Kareshi ni Narinasai yo" (Japanese: 私の彼氏になりなさいよ)	Yoshiyuki Shirahata	Yasuhiro Nakanishi	Yoshiyuki Shirahata	April 24, 2022
Sixteen years ago, two babies are accidentally switched at birth. In the present, Nagi Umino is to meet his biological parents for the first time. Nagi sees a girl, Erika Amano, about to jump from a bridge and pulls her back. She explains she was recording a video for Inusta, on which she is an internet celebrity, to antagonize her wealthy parents into letting her out of an arranged marriage. She instead blackmails Nagi into pretending to be her boyfriend. Several of Erika's fans attempt to beat Nagi for dating Erika, but Nagi beats them instead, revealing his adoptive parents are former delinquents. Erika decides to simply punch her fiancé instead of blackmailing Nagi and departs. Nagi rushes to the meeting with his adoptive and biological parents who explain that since they don't want to lose the children they raised, they instead want them to marry. Erika walks in and is revealed as the baby with whom Nagi was switched, now his official fiancé. Erika follows through on her decision and punches him. Nagi returns to school and sees Hiro Segawa, his academic rival and crush whom he has decided to only confess to once he has beaten her exam scores as she once told him she would only date a man smarter than herself. Meanwhile, Nagi's sister, Sachi, realizes the revelation means they aren't blood-related siblings.
2	"I'm not going to marry you." Transliteration: "Kekkon nara Shinai wa yo?" (Japanese: 結婚ならしないわよ？)	Mayu Numayama	Yasuhiro Nakanishi	Kunihisa Sugishima	May 1, 2022
Nagi is surprised when Erika visits his home. Due to her wealthy upbringing, Erika is completely out of touch with normal life and struggles to believe Nagi's entire family lives in such a small house. She invites Nagi to her family home, an opulent mansion, also revealing they own six similar homes throughout Japan and other countries. Nagi begins to have serious doubts a marriage between them would work and decides he needs to reject their engagement. Erika suddenly rejects him first and demands to see his parents and tell them so. At their diner, Nagi's parents fawn over Erika, and Nagi panics while Erika visibly becomes more upset. When they insist Erika meet Sachi, her biological sister, Erika abruptly leaves crying, revealing to Nagi his parents are such kind people she couldn't stand to disappoint them by ending the engagement. After reassuring her, Nagi brings her back to the diner and everyone has a family dinner together. Sachi covertly adds Erika's chopsticks to their family utensil jug, suggesting she likes Erika. Walking Erika home, Nagi meets her father, his biological father, who is confident that despite their unusual meeting, they will do well as a married couple, so confident in the fact that to prove it he has bought them a house and insists they live there together for two weeks.
3	"You aren't going to beat me!!!!" Transliteration: "Zettai ni Makenai kara!!!!" (Japanese: 絶対に負けないから!!!!)	Yoshitaka Nagaoka	Yasuhiro Nakanishi	Yoshitaka Nagaoka	May 8, 2022
Nagi decides to spend the two weeks studying for his next exam to defeat Hiro. He hears Erika scream and barges into the bathroom, finding her completely naked, having been startled by a harmless lizard. Nagi is forced to borrow Erika's study materials in exchange for taking pictures for her social media. By accident, they take several pictures that make them look like a couple. Nagi explains he is obsessed with studying so he can support his parents when they retire, whereas Erika likes social media because she hopes if she becomes famous someone she has been looking for will contact her. Nagi discovers he has actually defeated Hiro in the exam and Hiro asks to meet him alone. Nagi expects her to confess now he has proven he is smart enough for her, but instead she declares she only lost because she missed the exam due to a family funeral, and she will beat him on the next exam. Her competitiveness makes Nagi admire her even more. Nagi catches a cold and passes out still trying to study. Erika looks after him and admits his devotion to studying impressed her, surprising Nagi as everyone else keeps telling him he studies too much. Hiro is shown to be pushing herself even harder so she can defeat Nagi.
4	"Would you please go out with me...?" Transliteration: "Ore to Tsukiatte Kuremasu ka...?" (Japanese: 俺と付き合ってくれますか...？)	Shūji Saitō	Yasuhiro Nakanishi	Hiroki Itai	May 15, 2022
Hiro asks Nagi why he tried so hard to beat her, so explains how he knew she would only date someone smarter than her. Hiro reminds him this was only the first exam he has beaten her in, whereas she has beaten him in ten; she also reveals she is already engaged. Erika reminds Nagi it is his last night living with her and they agree to tell their parents they hated the experience. However, Nagi learns his family moved into a hotel after a pipe burst at their home, forcing him to continue living with Erika. Sachi is upset Nagi won't be coming home and decides to visit. Erika panics as Sachi is technically her real sister. The initial meeting is awkward so to break the ice, Nagi insists they cook dinner together. Erika has never cooked and is ignorant of the basics, whereas Sachi is unfamiliar with the expensive gadgets in Erika's kitchen, so Nagi ends up doing most of the cooking. During dinner, he points out that Erika and Sachi are actually quite alike in their behaviors. Erika gives Sachi some of her dresses after learning she only owns her school uniform and Nagi's hand-me-down boy's clothes. She also lets Sachi know she and Nagi have no intention of going through with the marriage. Before she leaves, Sachi takes a picture with Erika.
5	"Can we do our morning study sessions together...?" Transliteration: "Issho ni Asa Katsu Dekiru ka na...?" (Japanese: 一緒に朝活できるかな...？)	Chihiro Kumano	Yasuhiro Nakanishi	Hiroaki Yoshikawa	May 22, 2022
Nagi tries to avoid Hiro but is surprised when Hiro approaches him asking to study together, giving him hope she prefers him to her fiancé. They realize they both collect commemorative Shinto shrine stamps, so they compete over collecting the most stamps. Hiro asks if they can study together every morning and Nagi considers telling her he is engaged. Erika transfers into his class, explaining she accidentally uploaded one of their fake couple pictures to the internet. Her all-girls school demanded she attend a disciplinary meeting but she skipped it due to caring for Nagi during his cold, so her father transferred her to Nagi's school. She forbids Nagi from telling anyone at school they are engaged. As a class rep, Hiro shows Erika the school and Nagi is terrified of what might happen if his fiancé and his crush become friends. He eventually decides Erika needs a real friend, unlike the shallow girls at her previous school, and helps her, for which Erika is grateful. Hiro is suspicious at how Nagi knows so much about Erika so she claims he is a fan, causing another bout of competitiveness between them, as Hiro turns out to be a big fan of Erika. Hiro invites Erika to attend her and Nagi's study sessions, making Nagi feel even more awkward.
6	"I thought you lived by yourself." Transliteration: "Hitori de Sunderun da yo ne?" (Japanese: 一人で住んでるんだよね？)	Yoshiyuki Shirahata	Yasuhiro Nakanishi	Yoshiyuki Shirahata	May 29, 2022
Nagi admits to Erika that he confessed to Hiro, so she decides to help him. At their first study session, Erika literally dresses as Cupid, but her efforts fail. The way they argue makes Hiro suspicious due to how close they act. Hiro asks if she can visit Erika's home to study. Nagi tells Erika to take Hiro to her original mansion, only for Erika and Hiro to arrive at their house as her mansion is being remodelled. To make matters worse, Nagi is briefly naked. Communicating through text, Nagi hides all the evidence of them living together before hiding in his room, after Erika pushed Hiro into the swimming pool. Unfortunately, the obsessive fans Nagi beat up when he first met Erika find the house and break into the garden, forcing Nagi to leave his room to beat them up again. Hiro finally leaves and the next day invites them to her home to study, revealing her family manages the local shrine where Nagi is able to collect their shrine stamp. They meet Hiro's mother, who is less than happy at Nagi's presence. While Erika is away Hiro admits that when she said she was engaged, she actually meant that one day she would inherit the shrine but phrased it to sound like she had a fiancé to deter Nagi from pursuing her. She suspected he would probably give up his future plans to run the shrine with her and didn't want to place that burden on him.
7	"Is my fate going to change?" Transliteration: "Unmei, Kawatchau no ka na?" (Japanese: 運命、変わっちゃうのかな？)	Marina Maki	Yasuhiro Nakanishi	Yoshiaki Okumura	June 5, 2022
Privately, Nagi decides he can run the shrine and must learn more about Hiro's family. A field trip to Kamakura approaches and while Erika refuses to go, she manipulates Nagi into going by helping him form a group with Hiro. Hiro insists their group project be a contest to collect the most shrine stamps. When asked about her answer to his confession, Hiro admits her parents are forcing her to inherit the shrine, which she does not want, and wants Nagi to change her fate. Erika reveals one of her fans from the class named Shion has forced his way into Nagi's group, having mistakenly assumed Erika would be in the group, so she agrees to go to prevent him from bothering Nagi and Hiro. Shion turns out to be an annoying superfan but does help Erika take excellent photos. Nagi watches them constantly, so much so he forgets to spend time with Hiro who goes stamp collecting alone. Nagi decides to help Erika take another photo but they argue over it so much they accidentally take another perfect couple photo, though it ends up being Erika's favorite. Nagi asks about the mystery person Erika has been searching for and she warns him knowing who the person is would change his future.
8	"Are you going to marry him?" Transliteration: "Kono Mama Kekkon Shichau no?" (Japanese: このまま結婚しちゃうの？)	Yoshitaka Nagaoka	Yasuhiro Nakanishi	Yoshitaka Nagaoka	June 12, 2022
The next day, Erika runs errands and while she is away, Sachi visits. Based on his attitude she accuses Nagi of fighting with Erika until he admits his dilemma and decides he will ask Erika who she is looking for. Sachi decides to live with Nagi and Erika, claiming the rented room she shares with their parents makes studying difficult. Nagi attempts to be strict with her but gets no support from Erika who is glad to see Sachi. Once alone, Erika asks Sachi's real motive and Sachi admits since Erika appeared she has been scared she and Nagi will marry and she will never see him again. Overhearing this, Nagi decides to let her stay but immediately regrets it as Sachi takes his room. Forced to go shopping for Sachi's essentials, Nagi realizes Sachi is popular with people. Erika insists on taking new family photographs including Sachi and moves her into her bedroom, learning Sachi talks in her sleep. Nagi finally talks to Erika and admits that he is not yet ready for his future to change, but once he is he would like to know who she is searching for. Erika is amused that he has been worrying but agrees to tell him once he is ready.
9	"The Kuroshio currents beckon to me." Transliteration: "Kuroshio ga Ore o Yondeiru ze...!!" (Japanese: 黒潮が俺を呼んでいるぜ...!!)	Takatoshi Suzuki	Yasuhiro Nakanishi	Kunihisa Sugishima	June 19, 2022 (Note: This episode aired at 3:00 a.m. JST, 1 hour and 30 minutes after the original air time on TV Asahi.)
Hiro asks Nagi on a date to an amusement park but he is disappointed when she admits she needs him for the two-person discount. She apologizes for having left him during the trip to Kamakura as she had gotten lost. While exploring a mirror maze, Nagi believes he accidentally kissed Hiro, which amuses her as he had actually kissed a mirror. Sachi is in a foul mood she claims is caused by Nagi being on a date, despite being Erika's fiancé. She takes Erika to a baseball center and then to a public bath where Erika admits she is glad Sachi is her sister, but Sachi is still upset everything is changing. Returning from his date, Sachi makes sure to torment Nagi over it; meanwhile, Erika decides to invite her mother to the bathhouse. In the middle of the night, Nagi and Sachi's father, Yohei, appears to take them all fishing, something Nagi despises due to seasickness, as he wants to spend time with all his children. Remembering that Yohei said he would stop taking him fishing if he caught a bigger fish than him, Nagi becomes super serious about fishing but still only catches the smallest fish. By the end of the trip, Nagi realizes Yohei only ever dragged him fishing when he was stressed, helping Nagi take his mind off the problem, so he thanks Yohei for his help. Erika wonders what kind of person she might have become had she been raised by her biological family.
10	"Don't treat me like your kid sister." Transliteration: "Imōto Atsukai Shinaide yo" (Japanese: 妹扱いしないでよ)	Chihiro Kumano	Yasuhiro Nakanishi	Ken'ichi Nishida	June 26, 2022
Erika spends Mother's Day with her mother, Ritsuko. Sachi decides to get their mother, Namie, a gift and seeks Nagi's help. Eventually, they decide on an apron she can wear in the restaurant. Nagi pats Sachi's head for thinking of the idea, which annoys her that he is treating her like a little sister. They deliver the apron but leave without being seen. Erika tells Ritsuko she sometimes thinks Nagi might be better off marrying Sachi. The next day, Erika receives a text from her father, Soichiro, and immediately drags Nagi out shopping, eventually revealing Soichiro asked to visit so she is avoiding him in case he wants to take her home. Soichiro arrives and finds only Sachi, so he takes her to dinner in exchange for telling him about Erika and Nagi. Erika decides to confront Soichiro but Nagi instead chooses to help her continue avoiding him. Sachi admits that, even though Erika and Nagi argue constantly, they are closer friends because of it. Soichiro offers to continue bribing Sachi with sweets in exchange for updates on Erika and Nagi, which Sachi accepts. Soichiro returns to his office where he ponders the child rearing practices of cuckoo birds and reveals a picture of himself, Ritsuko, Erika, and a boy that looks like Nagi.
11	"I can't forget that just happened." Transliteration: "Nakatta Koto ni Nante Dekinai yo" (Japanese: 無かったことになんて出来ないよ)	Shūji Saitō	Yasuhiro Nakanishi	Jun Hatori	July 3, 2022
Sachi returns to working at their parents' diner but still refuses to move back home. Lightning knocks out the city's power, leaving Nagi and Erika in the dark. Erika asks if Nagi enjoys living with her since she has enjoyed every day since meeting Nagi and Sachi. Nagi admits he has enjoyed himself too. In the dark Nagi bumps into and kisses Erika, only for the lights to come back on and reveal he actually kissed Sachi who had just gotten home. Sachi is embarrassed but becomes angry when Nagi points out he thought she was Erika and should just forget the kiss. The next day Sachi treats Nagi coldly but when her friends at school discuss a TV show that includes siblings falling in love she starts to wonder if she loves Nagi. Erika notices the tense atmosphere and, when Nagi explains about the accidental kiss, points out just how much he screwed up. He might consider Sachi his little sister, but Sachi is almost a grown woman and not even his blood relative. Nagi is unsure how to apologize, but after a pep talk from Hiro he manages to apologize to Sachi and promises to stop thinking of her as a child but as a woman. Sachi forgives him and begins acting much happier.
12	"It's not that I like you, yet." Transliteration: "Suki ja Nai, Mada" (Japanese: 好きじゃない、まだ)	Mayu Numayama	Yasuhiro Nakanishi	Kunihisa Sugishima	July 10, 2022
Erika asks Nagi to take her shopping but he refuses, claiming he has plans. He invites Hiro to study to make up for embarrassing himself at the amusement park. As the public library has a no-talking policy they are forced to communicate through notes, though this ends up being more intimate. Hiro invites Nagi to a kickboxing gym. Erika sees them sparring and becomes upset. The next day Erika demands Nagi take her on a date. After forcing him to go jogging she explains she thought he enjoyed exercise since he went kickboxing. Since Erika has never experienced jealousy before, Nagi has to explain that jealousy means she must like him. This infuriates her so she blurts out she doesn't like him “yet”, then runs away. The “yet” confuses Nagi and he starts to wonder if maybe he likes Erika. He visits his parents' restaurant where by chance he discovers embarrassing love letters Yohei wrote to Namie in high school. Yohei claims love causes people to do embarrassing things, but if it is true love it is worth it. Nagi doubts he could do it so Yohei demands he just feel who is in his heart. Nagi does so and becomes even more confused when he feels Erika, Hiro, and Sachi all have equal places in his heart. Erika later receives a text from Nagi stating he also doesn't like her “yet”.
13	"Things aren't quite working out, are they?" Transliteration: "Nakanaka Umaku Ikanai nē" (Japanese: なかなかうまくいかないねぇ)	Yoshitaka Nagaoka	Yasuhiro Nakanishi	Yoshiaki Okumura	July 24, 2022
Nagi is so distracted by his feelings during exams that not only does Hiro retake first place, he falls to 13th in the exam rankings. Hiro appears upset by this, which makes Nagi feel worse. Erika doesn't see the problem until Sachi reminds her Nagi has never once fallen below 2nd place, let alone 13th. Nagi blames his overconfidence on having beaten Hiro once, plus barely studying since he started having fun with Erika. Erika manages to argue him into feeling better. The next day Hiro is unexpectedly late to their morning study session, but when she does arrive and hears Nagi and Erika arguing like usual, she decides to leave and becomes even more distant from Nagi. Nagi is depressed until he receives a sudden summons from Hiro to meet her. Erika is convinced Hiro has given up on Nagi after his disastrous exam results and is probably going to permanently reject him. However, Hiro is unconcerned with his grades and is more upset that it was Erika who made him feel better, and not her, his academic rival. Realizing he still loves Hiro and she still cares for him Nagi begins studying properly again. Erika asks for his help to fix her own terrible grades, revealing if she fails any of her next exams her parents will force her to move back home with them.
14	"Walls exist to be overcome!!" Transliteration: "Kabe wa Koeru Tame ni Aru!!" (Japanese: 壁は超えるためにある!!)	Takatoshi Suzuki	Yasuhiro Nakanishi	Takashi Naoya	July 31, 2022 (Note: This episode aired at 1:50 a.m. JST, 20 minutes after the original air time on TV Asahi.)
When over three hours she can't answer a single question Erika resigns herself to moving out. Nagi is disappointed as he and Sachi will have to move back home to their parent's cramped flat. Later he realises Erika has been studying by herself all night and Sachi demands that, rather than half-heartedly teaching while doing his own studying, he should teach her properly. Realizing he hasn't been of any actual help Nagi bursts into Erika's room and announces he will teach her the most basic technique to pass exams, rote memorization of typical exam questions. After a weekend of intense study, Erika gets a passing grade. Soichiro is happy his plan to manipulate Erika worked. Sachi invites Erika to a festival near their parents' diner, though she and Nagi are expected to help run their parent's yakisoba stall. Sachi is intensely embarrassed when a customer thinks she and Nagi are a couple. Hiro appears and asks Nagi to visit the rest of the festival once he is done working. Sachi is irritated he won't be going with her and Erika. Later, Hiro meets Erika and Sachi together but is confused about how Sachi is somehow both Erika and Nagi's sister.
15	"We have to tell her... about our secret!" Transliteration: "Iu Shikanai, Oretachi no Himitsu...!" (Japanese: 言うしかない、俺たちの秘密...！)	Fumio Maezono	Yasuhiro Nakanishi	Yoshiaki Okumura	August 7, 2022
Nagi and Erika end up alone at the festival. Erika draws attention from her fans, so Nagi buys a mask. Nagi bumps into Sachi with her friends and overhears them teasing Sachi about her brother-complex. Erika is suddenly swarmed by the fans who tried to break into their house, one of whom has trained his muscles for his rematch with Nagi. Not wanting to cause a scene Nagi and Erika flee. Erika decides this summer has been her favorite, even compared to summers she spent with her parents on foreign holidays. They watch the fireworks together, and both Sachi and Hiro are disappointed they didn't get to watch them with Nagi. Hiro catches up to them and finally asks how they are related since they both claim Sachi is their sister. Nagi feels guilty so they finally tell Hiro about being switched at birth and now engaged. Hiro accepts the explanation and Erika hopes they will now be better friends. As she has to buy a gift for Sachi Erika remains at the festival while Nagi walks Hiro home. Hiro makes Nagi promise to never keep another secret and he agrees, though their interaction is seen by Sachi. Nagi returns home happier than ever while Sachi asks Erika about Hiro.
16	"I want to talk about now." Transliteration: "Ima no Kaiwa ga Shitain Desu" (Japanese: 今の会話がしたいんです)	Nobuyoshi Arai	Yasuhiro Nakanishi	Nobuyoshi Arai	August 14, 2022 (Note: This episode aired at 2:00 a.m. JST, 30 minutes after the original air time on TV Asahi.)
Erika and Sachi spend all day following Hiro but find nothing suspicious about her. Sachi announces she plans to attend the same high school as Nagi and begins studying diligently. Nagi shares with Erika how he feels Sachi is acting strangely and feels less and less like a sister. Sachi attends an open-day at the school with Hiro as her guide. Sachi asks Hiro what she thinks about Nagi. Hiro repeats her claim she is engaged but admits she is fascinated by Nagi. Nagi rushes to hear what they are saying but finds Sachi and Hiro have somehow become friends. At home, Sachi has kept on studying but Nagi remains worried as their school is a private academy with yearly fees and their parents already struggle to pay just for him. However, their parents decide if Sachi gets accepted they will just sell their restaurant to pay the fees. Sachi refuses to let that happen and a battle of wills breaks out between Sachi and Namie with Nagi and Yohei terrified and powerless to stop them until Erika steps in to calm everyone. As they return home Sachi calls Erika Sister for the first time, leaving Nagi disappointed she didn't call him Brother.
17	"Anything could happen right now!" Transliteration: "Nani ga Okite mo Okashikunai node wa!!?" (Japanese: なにが起きてもおかしくないのでは!!?)	Yoshiaki Okumura	Yasuhiro Nakanishi	Norihiro Naganuma	August 21, 2022
Nagi, Erika, and Hiro decide to study at Erika's holiday home in Karuizawa, though Shion invites himself as well. Erika makes sure to hide a photo on a display table before anyone sees it. Shion goes food shopping with Erika, leaving Nagi alone with Hiro. Hiro decides they should sneak away to a nearby lake where she admits sometimes she finds it hard to focus on studying. Shion decides there is something he wants Erika to know. Hiro decides to take a bath, distracting Nagi who cannot study knowing Hiro is naked. Erika returns and joins Hiro in the bath. Shion claims he confessed to Erika, though it transpires he only thanked her for inviting him to study with them. Nagi is relieved it wasn't a confession but then confused as to why he was relieved. Erika reveals to Hiro she forgot to pack anything for the trip, like underwear or pajamas. They attempt to study until Shion reveals he found a shrine in the forest perfect for a test of courage. Shion plans to go with Erika and Nagi with Hiro, but Erika suddenly chooses to go with Nagi, claiming she has something important to discuss. Knowing Nagi needs to beat Hiro at exams to date Shion asks why Hiro is obsessed with scoring the highest. She avoids answering and instead offers to help Shion confess to Erika, though she hides her reason for doing so.
18	"Who is that person?" Transliteration: "Sono Hito wa Dare...?" (Japanese: その人は誰...？)	Shūji Saitō	Yasuhiro Nakanishi	Ken'ichi Nishida	August 28, 2022
Sachi, sick with a fever, is taken to hospital. Erika explains to Nagi she has run out of underwear and is naked under her dress, so she brings him with her as he is the only one she trusts to walk her to a convenience store to buy some. After dinner, Hiro comments Nagi seems happier and he realizes he is actually enjoying himself. Nagi suggests they go star-gazing but he receives a text from Namie about Sachi. Erika eventually realizes Nagi is missing, having left to get the train home without telling anyone. At the hospital, Sachi scolds Nagi for abandoning his friends but is happy he came. Erika returns home and Nagi is surprised she agrees he did the right thing. Her response makes Nagi realize due to their different upbringings he really has no idea about Erika's personal life. Hiro ponders a picture she saw, the one Erika tried to hide. Soichiro goes to Karuizawa and retrieves the picture, revealing it is the picture showing Erika and a boy resembling Nagi, and that he placed it there hoping Nagi would see it. Nagi confronts Erika about the person she is trying to find, having realized it must be someone she loves, and finally asks her who it is, regardless of the consequences.
19	"You must have noticed by now." Transliteration: "Mō Kizuite Irunda yo ne...?" (Japanese: もう気づいているんだよね...？)	Shinya Sasaki	Yasuhiro Nakanishi	Kunihisa Sugishima	September 4, 2022
Erika shows Nagi the picture and confirms that it is not actually Nagi, it is her older brother Sosuke, Nagi's biological older brother. She is surprised when Nagi fails to react to the news. For unexplained reasons, Erika's parents pretend Sosuke does not exist, but Erika always wanted to see him again and when she first met Nagi she initially thought he was Sosuke. Erika is close to giving up being an internet celebrity as her fame has not prompted Sosuke to contact her even once. Nagi decides they will find Sosuke together by searching for him directly instead of waiting for him to contact Erika. Sachi finally returns from the hospital. Nagi thinks back over his every interaction with Erika and convinces himself he was just a substitute for Sosuke. He decides to ask his biological parents, Soichiro and Ritsuko, the truth about Sosuke. Soichiro turns out to have been expecting Nagi to visit. Erika tells Sachi about Sosuke and Sachi realizes it explains a lot about Erika's personality; she is a younger sister too. Soichiro continues to claim Sosuke does not exist and shocks Nagi by suggesting that all his troubles would be solved if Nagi married Sachi.
20	"I want to grow up already!" Transliteration: "Hayaku Otona ni Naritāi!!!!" (Japanese: 早く大人になりたーい!!!!)	Fumio Maezono	Yasuhiro Nakanishi	Yoshiaki Okumura	September 11, 2022
Nagi returns home frustrated at having learned nothing about Sosuke and finds Erika and Sachi preparing for summer break. Erika is unsurprised he failed and surprisingly does agree Nagi could technically marry Sachi, but then goes quiet when Nagi points out, by Souichiro's logic, Erika could marry Sosuke. Out of nowhere, Hiro invites Nagi on a second date to go bicycling. Before they leave she poses him a riddle; What is the nearest and farthest thing? On their ride, Nagi thinks about Souichiro's confusing and irritating behavior. He and Hiro arrive at a beach where Hiro reveals the riddle answer is Family. Nagi admits he is frustrated by Souichiro while Hiro admits she wants to grow to an adult as quickly as possible, but doesn't explain why. Sachi has another meal with Souichiro who outright asks her if she is willing to marry Nagi. Returning home Sachi begins acting distantly, worrying Nagi with her behaviour. Sachi becomes angrier every time Nagi acts like an older brother and, in her frustration, asks him if she were to propose marriage to him would he marry her? When he claims he wouldn't because she is his sister, she pretends to have been joking.
21	"It's a secret between you and me." Transliteration: "Watashi to Nagi-kun dake no Himitsu jan" (Japanese: 私と凪くんだけの秘密じゃん)	Takatoshi Suzuki	Yasuhiro Nakanishi	Ken'ichi Nishida	September 18, 2022
Nagi receives his end-of-year report and, despite his temporary fall to 13th place, has risen to 1st. Nagi hopes he and Hiro will start dating, but Hiro turns him down again, citing the existence of her fiancé, though she does wish she were Nagi's fiancé instead. Erika invites everyone to one of her beach houses so they can discover what Hiro means. Erika decides Hiro can't discover they are living together, but when they return home Sachi invites Hiro over to study. Hiro is actually not surprised as she had suspected they lived together for some time. At the beach, Nagi asks why Sachi told Hiro the truth. Sachi claims it was so Hiro could come over more often to tutor her, so Nagi shouldn't complain as it means he can see Hiro more often. Nagi is unsure so Erika offers to talk to Hiro since she suspects Souichiro is really to blame. Nagi apologizes to Hiro, and while she isn't upset he has been lying, she does seem upset that he has fun with Erika while living together. She forgives him and then reveals Sachi has a crush on him, to his disbelief. Erika is convinced Hiro is in love with Nagi but Sachi is doubtful. Nagi bluntly asks Sachi if she has a crush on him, and though she punishes him for embarrassing her, she never actually denies it.
22	"I'll be with you when you meet him." Transliteration: "Au Toki wa Ore mo Issho da" (Japanese: 会う時は俺も一緒だ)	Yoshiaki Okumura	Yasuhiro Nakanishi	Kunihisa Sugishima	September 25, 2022
Sachi is mad at Hiro for what she told Nagi but is also confused about what Soichiro had said. Nagi decides to bathe naked in Erika's outdoor bath and is shocked when she joins him, also naked. At first Nagi thinks she is trying to seduce him, realising too late Erika actually had a bikini on. Later, Erika explains the house only has two beds and by drawing lots Sachi must share with Nagi. Erika asks about Hiro's fiancé and she admits she has never met him. Hiro then asks if Erika would let her marry Nagi instead, but Hiro falls asleep before Erika can answer. Nagi cannot sleep so close to Sachi so he leaves and finds Erika, who had remembered she and Sosuke came to the beach house every summer. From this, Erika finds evidence on a games console that Sosuke was in the beach house only three days ago. Hoping Sosuke might still be in the nearby town Nagi rushes to locate him. Erika is scared that they might find Sosuke so suddenly after years of searching and can't think what she would say to him, so Nagi promises to support her. After searching all day no one in the town knows Sosuke, so Erika decides Sosuke must have left already, but is still grateful to Nagi for his help.
23	"What should we do now?" Transliteration: "Kore kara Dō Shiyokka" (Japanese: これからどうしよっか)	Tomio Yamauchi	Yasuhiro Nakanishi	Hitoyuki Matsui	October 2, 2022 (Note: The final 2 episodes air back-to-back on TV Asahi.)
Hiro announces she and Nagi will travel home separately from Erika and Sachi and take the train to a nearby shrine so they can collect the stamp together. Erika reveals to Sachi that Hiro wants to marry Nagi. The train is cancelled, stranding Nagi and Hiro. Erika and Sachi are horrified when Nagi texts them that he and Hiro will be staying the night. Nagi is embarrassed when, in order to get a hotel room, he and Hiro must claim to be married. Nagi promises to sleep on the floor but when Hiro trips over her bath robe they end up on the bed. Nagi tries to stand but Hiro comments that, since they lied to get the room, doing another bad thing won't matter. Nagi is embarrassed when Hiro actually suggests they buy alcohol as she is tired of being a perfect student and wants to misbehave for once. The police suddenly arrive and Nagi panics as he worries lying about their age will lead to being expelled from school. It turns out to be a prank by Erika and Sachi who hired a taxi to pick them up. As Nagi was half naked and changing clothes, he is punished by Erika and Sachi who demand to know if anything happened but Hiro gives a deliberately vague answer as they drive home.
24	"All that matters is that you two are happy" Transliteration: "Futari ga Shiawase nara Sore ga Ichiban jan" (Japanese: 二人が幸せならそれが一番じゃん)	Chihiro Kumano	Yasuhiro Nakanishi	Yoshiyuki Shirahata	October 2, 2022
Nagi, Sachi and Erika are invited to Yohei's birthday. Erika looks at photos from Yohei's previous birthdays and sees in one of them a young girl with silver hair. Namie and Yohei reveal they wanted Nagi and Erika to marry as a way to keep all their children together, but they no longer worry about it. Nagi and Erika realise that there really is no longer a reason for them to stay engaged. The next day Erika comes down with a fever. Sachi and Hiro appoint themselves her nurses but Erika sends them away. Nagi steps in and discovers Erika has been so concerned about Sachi and Hiro she tired herself out until she became sick. Erika asks how Nagi knows her so well and he claims it is because she is his fiancée. Overhearing, Sachi and Hiro realise Erika will always be closest to Nagi, upsetting Hiro in particular. Yohei sends them a copy of his birthday photo, which includes Erika. Erika wonders if one day she will have a family like Nagi's, and Nagi hints anything is possible. Sachi sneaks out to another meeting with Soichiro who is pleased Nagi and Erika are making good progress towards marriage but he intends it to be their choice without pressure from him. Meanwhile, Erika and Nagi resume arguing about household chores and both despair about being engaged to someone so irritating.

===== Season 2 =====
No.	Title	Directed by	Written by	Storyboarded by	Original release date
1	"Who Was Umino-kun's First Love"; Transliteration: "Umino-kun no Hatsukoi Aite wa Dare Desu ka?" (Japanese: 海野君の初恋相手は誰ですか？)	Masakazu Hishida	Jō Aoba	Masakazu Hishida	July 8, 2025
A girl with silver hair lands at the airport. Hiro asks to move into Erika and Nagi's house rather than meet her fiancé. The girls decide Erika and Sachi will share Erika's room, Hiro takes Nagi's, and Nagi is banished to the cupboard. Erika points out living together means learning a lot about each other, including things they might not like. Nagi decides they need to share chores. Unfortunately, Hiro cooks so slowly it takes all day to make breakfast, Sachi destroys the washing machine and Erika does nothing at all. Hiro unexpectedly asks to play the ghost game Kokkuri-san which Nagi suspects might reveal embarrassing information. Hiro asks Kokkuri who was Nagi's first love and gets the answer Ai. Nagi abruptly remembers Ai was a childhood friend he confessed to in junior school but she moved abroad before giving her answer. The next day the girls all leave so Nagi takes advantage to go nude swimming in the pool, but Sachi returns early, embarrassing him. Sachi advises he needs to move on from Hiro and marry Erika, or else choose to not marry at all. Erika suddenly returns home with news Hiro was kidnapped in broad daylight. The silver haired girl locates Nagi's parent's restaurant, obsessively searching for Nagi.
2	"Onii Confessed to You, Didn't He?"; Transliteration: "Onī ni Kokuhaku Sareteta yo ne...?" (Japanese: お兄に告白されてたよね...？)	Yuki Iwasaki	Jō Aoba	Yuki Iwasaki	July 15, 2025
Erika explains Hiro was picked up by her mother to meet her fiancé. Hiro impulsively storms their family shrine, grabs Hiro and flees with her. Nagi has a flashback to when Hiro transferred to his school and started beating him in exams. At first he was upset but eventually started to respect her. The silver haired girl, Ai, is welcomed by Nagi’s parents and Sachi. Ai reveals her family has separated, never to see each other again; her father to Singapore, her mother to France and Ai to Japan. While hiding Hiro reveals the reason she always tried to get first place in exams was to show her parents she was capable on her own, and didn’t need a fiancé to manage the shrine. Erika appears and drags them back to Hiro’s mother. Hiro’s mother accepts Hiro is strongly opposed to being engaged and agrees they need to discuss it properly. Nagi apologises to Erika for causing her trouble. Erika assures him he did a good thing for Hiro. Sachi takes Ai to meet Nagi where she abruptly reveals she came to Japan specifically to respond to Nagi’s confession from seven years ago. Despite being engaged to Erika, Ai plans to be the one to marry Nagi.
3	"That, But Times a Hundred"; Transliteration: "Sore o 100 bai ni Shita Kanji ka na" (Japanese: それを100倍にした感じかな)	Hideaki Uehara	Jō Aoba	Hideaki Uehara	July 22, 2025
Nagi rejects her proposal as he is already in love. Ai declares she has waited seven years and won't be deterred easily, shocking him. Erika asks Nagi what love is like. Nagi claims it is the happiest feeling in the world, only times 100. This confuses Erika as Hiro and Ai are nothing alike yet Nagi fell in love with them both. She also wonders if Nagi might fall in love with her one day. Eavesdropping, Sachi wonders the same thing. Privately, Erika considers if she might already love Nagi. Sachi reveals she is going on a date with Matsuda from her class. Worried, Erika and Nagi follow in secret, though once the date is over Sachi confronts them and claims she agreed to date Matsuda because he is smart and she needs help on her exams. Confused, Nagi goes for a walk and encounters Hiro who reveals she postponed meeting her fiancé. She also deduces Sachi is using Matsuda to test Nagi. Feeling worse Nagi rushes home and overhears Sachi talking about Matsuda jumping on her. Pushed to his limit Nagi yells he can't stand her dating Matsuda. Sachi reveals she was actually talking about Erika's dog jumping on her, and only used Matsuda to test Nagi. Humiliated, Nagi hides in his room. Sachi secretly confirms Nagi does care about her.
4	"I See You're All Together"; Transliteration: "Mina-san Osoroite" (Japanese: みなさんおそろいで)	Masakazu Hishida; Hirokazu Sakamoto	Jō Aoba	Hirokazu Sakamoto	July 29, 2025
Ai challenges Erika to a game of darts; if Erika loses she must break up with Nagi and if Ai loses she is banned form their house. During the game Ai reveals she works as a singer. Ai suddenly announces Erika is no longer her enemy as it is Sachi she really needs to worry about. She also tells Nagi he is clearly stuck in a situation but he can choose to leave it all behind and marry her instead. Nagi's heart skips a beat as Ai is the first girl to confess to him. Unfamiliar with this feeling he visits Hiro and tells her what happened. At first she seems angry but abruptly invites him, Erika, Sachi and Ai to her shrine's festival the next day. At the festival Hiro reveals there is a cosplay contest to win amusement park tickets, and she has already signed up Nagi as one of the judges. Erika disappoints the crowd by misunderstanding the meaning of "bunny girl" and dressing as a rabbit mascot. Sachi wears her normal school uniform to cosplay as a "little sister". Hiro cosplays as a shrine priestess, albeit in a much shorter skirt, thrilling everyone except her mother. Ai interrupts the contest in her singer persona and performs a song for the crowd who recognise her from her popular online videos.
5	"It's My Life, Too!"; Transliteration: "Watashi no Jinsei de mo aru n da Kara ne!" (Japanese: 私の人生でもあるんだからね！)	Masakazu Hishida; Yūya Akahori	Jō Aoba	Yūya Akahori	August 5, 2025
The contest ends in a 4 way tie, but the others give the tickets to Sachi. Sachi is furious Nagi already visited the park with Hiro but feels somewhat better when she remembers she and Nagi were each other's first kiss, even if it was an accident. Nagi discovers Ai did a television interview revealing her identity and her anonymous boyfriend, though it is obvious she is referring to Nagi. Hiro is angry Nagi really was dating Ai and before Nagi can explain Hiro kisses him on the cheek then forbids him ever speaking to her again. Talking to Erika Nagi admits how angry he is and is surprised Erika agrees with him, since as his fiancée this will affect her as well. Nagi visits Ai who reveals it was Nagi that gave her the courage to start singing and every song she wrote was about him. Returning home Nagi finds his biological mother Ritsuko visiting Erika. Fortunately, Ritusko works in the media and knows Ai made up the interview. Unfortunately she knows Ai's claims plus Nagi and Erika being engaged has the potential to be a huge scandal, so she forcibly moves them into one of Soichiro's hotels where the media won't find them. Erika and Nagi are baffled they are expected to stay in the same room together for 2 weeks, with nothing to do to pass the time.
6	"There's No Way I Can Be Normal!!"; Transliteration: "Futsū de Irareru Wakenai Desho" (Japanese: 普通でいられるわけないでしょ...‼)	Masakazu Hishida; Kazama Hiromi	Jō Aoba	Kazama Hiromi	August 12, 2025
Erika suspects Ritsuko is tormenting them for fun. An erotic accident in the closet causes an argument while Ritsuko watches on hidden cameras. As more fights occur Ritsuko realises they are making no progress and increases the room's heating, making them both flustered, but only starts another argument. They eventually go to bed, with Erika blindfolded and Nagi tied up. They theorise Ritsuko is trying to force them to get along, yet remain determined to resist her. Ritsuko wonders how long they can last. Ai worries Nagi hasn't read any of her texts. The next morning they realise they are being petty and start getting along, with Erika announcing it is her decision whether to fall in love with Nagi. Realising she underestimated Erika Ritsuko changes her plans and announces a quiz for them with prizes, only to base the questions on embarrassing moments from Erika's childhood. Nagi realises Ritsuko is only trying to do her best for Erika but reiterates that it is his choice on whether to fall in love with Erika. Erika and Nagi instantly argue over exactly which of them gets to decide if they are in love. Ai locates the hotel. Ritsuko realises Nagi is exactly like his father Soichiro, loses interest in her game, and returns to work. For winning the quiz Nagi picks study materials as a prize, only for Ai to smuggle herself into the room with the materials.
7	"It's Ours to Build!"; Transliteration: "Sore wa watashitachi ga kizuku monona nodesu!" (Japanese: それは私たちが築くものなのです！)	Masakazu Hishida; Hiromi Kazama	Jō Aoba	Hiromi Kazama	August 19, 2025
Ai tries to convince Nagi to leave with her. Nagi refuses even though Ai claims he and Erika are more like siblings than lovers. Ai demands Erika end the engagement since they have nothing in common, whereas she has always planned on being Nagi's wife. Erika points out marriage does not always equal happiness, since her own parents are married but practically strangers due to their careers. Ai points out the same applies to them if they accept an arranged marriage. Nagi is completely confused when the argument somehow turns Erika and Ai into friends. Ai helps them escape the hotel but Ritsuko gets to Nagi alone and admits there is nothing she can do to change their growing relationship. She then cryptically informs Nagi his brother Sousuke, whom Erika is still searching for, is closer than she imagines and asks Nagi to save him. As the media are still interested in them Ai decides to send them to separate safe houses. Nagi is confused when he is sent to Hiro's shrine. She reveals Ai told her everything that happened, so she apologises for being angry and asks for his support in taking control of her own life. Erika is sent to Nagi's parent's restaurant for a week, thrilling them but upsetting Sachi. Nagi is astounded when Hiro asks him to marry her.
8	"No Such Thing as a Meaningless Kiss"; Transliteration: "Imi no Nai Kisu Nante Nai" (Japanese: 意味のないキスなんてない)	Yuki Iwasaki	Jō Aoba	Yuki Iwasaki	August 26, 2025
Hiro admits she meant fake wedding photographs for the shrine's wedding service pamphlets. Hiro's mother Asami forbids it since they are both engaged to other people. Hiro's father, a muscular giant, declares they can do the photographs if Nagi beats him at sumo. Nagi loses but receives permission anyway for his warrior spirit. Hiro's father reveals his marriage to Asami was arranged so Asami could inherit the shrine, though it was so difficult he would prefer Hiro married someone she loves. Nagi reveals Asami clearly loves her husband; she just gets nervous saying it out loud. Hiro is grateful Nagi realised this as she always thought Asami hated her father. Unfortunately, her father abruptly agrees with Asami that Hiro must marry her arranged fiancé. Hiro cheers up when Asami lets them do the photographs. Nagi asks Hiro why she kissed him before. Hiro claims there was a reason for the kiss and is looking forward to the wedding kiss. Meanwhile, Sachi feels better when Erika tells her nothing romantic happened in the hotel room. Nagi and Hiro invite everyone to attend the photo shoot as fake guests. Sachi refuses due to her studying. Erika and Ai are outraged there will be a real kiss, even if it is just for a photo. Just as Nagi and Hiro are about to kiss Sachi bursts in and refuses to let Hiro take Nagi away from her.
9	"The Real Enemy Is Sachi-chan!!"; Transliteration: "Hontō no Teki wa Sachi-chan na no desu...!!" (Japanese: 本当の敵は幸ちゃんなのです･･･!!)	Hirokazu Sakamoto	Jō Aoba	Hirokazu Sakamoto	September 2, 2025
Sachi explains the thought of him marrying Hiro was too upsetting. She also doesn't like that he now has complicated relationships with multiple girls. Nagi remembers Soichiro telling him marrying Sachi is an option. Erika suggests they take turns as the fake bride for more photos, during which Sachi kisses Nagi, shocking everyone since the kisses were supposed to be fake. Sachi claims it was an accident. Ai suggests a truce between her and Hiro as it is now clear Sachi is their real enemy. Nagi worries as the situation stirs up complicated feelings concerning Sachi. Erika later asks Sachi about the kiss who admits even she is unsure why she did it. Erika cryptically claims she understands but refuses to explain. After finally returning home Nagi avoids Sachi, upsetting her. Eventually, Erika forces them to sit and talk. Sachi admits she always suspected they weren't siblings but forced herself not to think about it, until they discovered they actually weren't siblings, which caused her old feelings to return. Nagi admits to similar feelings but assures her if they did marry at least it wouldn't be wrong, since they aren't blood related. They thank Erika for forcing them to talk, but to punish her rudeness they fake another kiss, causing Erika to panic and try to stop them before realising it was a prank.
10	"I Know, Nagi-kun! Let's Take Pictures for Memory's Sake!"; Transliteration: "Sō da Nagi-kun! Kinen Shashin Torō yo" (Japanese: そうだ風くん!記念写真撮ろうよ)	Hideaki Uehara	Jō Aoba	Hideaki Uehara	September 9, 2025
The M1 festival arrives, where students can perform on stage. Hiro offers to partner with Nagi, explaining the school legend that M1 partners end up marrying. Erika partners with Shion but admits she wanted to partner with Nagi. For inspiration Hiro shows a dvd of past M1 winners and Erika is surprised one of them was Ritsuko who confessed love to Soichiro on stage, except the dvd cuts out before the ending. Erika takes everyone to see Ritsuko who reveals her confession was actually a sketch written by Soichiro to highlight the absurdity of a rich girl being rejected by a working class boy. Not only did they win the M1 it inspired Ritsuko's career and caused her to fall in love with Soichiro. For their performances Hiro decides to shoot a bomb off Nagi's head with an arrow while Erika decides to shave Shion's hair. Nagi suddenly blurts out that he should partner with Erika instead, since his biological parents won before he thinks it is only fair he help Erika win this time. Hiro is disappointed but partners with Shion instead. Erika insists Nagi apologise for hurting Hiro's feelings again. Hiro accepts his apology when he insists he still wants to marry her and not Erika. She also admits being his opponent might be more fun. While arguing about their performance Nagi and Erika realise exactly which skit they should perform. Sachi texts Ai with a good idea.
11	"I Found Him Attractive for the First Time"; Transliteration: "Hajimete Kakkoii to Omotta" (Japanese: はじめてカッコイイと思った)	Yuki Iwasaki	Jō Aoba	Yuki Iwasaki	September 16, 2025
A man who has been following Nagi appears briefly outside his parents' restaurant, surprising Sachi as he looks just like Nagi. Her parents Yohei and Namie decide to attend M1. Soichiro visits Ritsuko and is scolded for making a secret deal with Erika that might affect whether she and Nagi continue living together. Erika decides to enjoy the festival and Nagi almost bumps into the man as they run past. Nagi deduces there is something Erika wants to tell him. Erika admits she briefly found him attractive for the first time. The M1 begins with dozens of acts, including a song by Ai and Sachi in disguises. Hiro and Shion forfeit to give Nagi and Erika a better chance at winning. Nagi and Erika present a dramatic performance admitting they were swapped at birth, then apologise for lying to everyone. The revelation falls flat as no one understands what they mean, and Nagi is forced to fight one of Erika's fans upset at their claim they are engaged. The M1 is cancelled and Nagi is suspended from school for fighting. At home he apologises to Erika but she suddenly kisses him. Sachi is upset but not surprised to see Erika finally kiss him. Erika decides it was a delayed response to Sachi kissing him during the wedding photoshoot and declares Nagi is her fiancé so she won't be letting Sachi steal him. Sachi notices Nagi blushing and worries what it might mean.
12	"Thank You for Falling in Love with Me"; Transliteration: "Ore no Koto o Suki ni Natte Kurete Arigatō" (Japanese: 俺のことを好きになってくれてありがとう)	Masakazu Hishida; Kazama Hiromi	Jō Aoba	Yūya Akahori; Kazama Hiromi	September 23, 2025
Hiro convinces Erika the kiss means she must think of Nagi like a brother. Ai convinces Erika she must actually think of Nagi as her best friend. Sachi claims Erika and Nagi are actually rivals and only kissed because of the extreme emotions from arguing constantly. Later, Nagi overhears Erika tell Soichiro she has realised she is in love with Nagi. When she realises Nagi heard her she insists he act like he didn't hear anything or it will complicate things. Nagi goes fishing with Yohei who tells him bluntly to realise he is in love with Erika. Nagi confesses to Erika, upsetting her for making it complicated. They meet with Soichiro and admit they have romantic feelings and want to continue living together. Soichiro is surprised since they previously showed no romantic interest. Erika points out it took Soichiro ten years to propose marriage to Ritsuko so he knows some relationships take time to grow. Soichiro decides they can keep living together. Nearby, the man following Nagi finds it funny their relationship obviously isn't going to go the way they hope. Hiro shows everyone the finished wedding pamphlets. Seeing all four girls as brides Nagi can't help worrying which direction his life will take. A short time later, Hiro asks Nagi to be her boyfriend.

== Reception ==
It was reported that the first volume of the manga sold out in stores due to high demand, and that sales exceeded the publisher and author's expectations. A Couple of Cuckoos ranked twelfth on Takarajimasha's Kono Manga ga Sugoi! list of best manga of 2021 for male readers. The series ranked fifth on the "Nationwide Bookstore Employees' Recommended Comics of 2021" by the Honya Club website. The manga was nominated for the 46th Kodansha Manga Award in the shōnen category in 2022.
