= List of Yamada-kun and the Seven Witches chapters =

The Yamada-kun and the Seven Witches manga is written and illustrated by Miki Yoshikawa and serialized in Kodansha's Weekly Shōnen Magazine. The first chapter was published in 2012's 12th issue, released on February 12, 2012. The series is also released in tankōbon volumes, the first of which was published on June 15, 2012. On October 26, 2013, Crunchyroll announced a partnership with Kodansha where it would distribute chapters digitally to 170 countries.

== Volumes ==
No.	Original release date	Original ISBN	English release date	English ISBN
1	June 15, 2012	978-4-06-384696-6	March 31, 2015	978-1-63236068-7
1. "Let's give it a shot." (してみましょう。, Shite Mimashou); 2. "Let me have a look, too!" (俺にも見せろよー。, Orenimo Misero yo-); 3. "I don't hate strong women." (強い女嫌いじゃねえよ。, Tuyoionnna Kirai ja Nee yo); 4. "She's an E-Cup!" (Eだ。, EDa); 5. "Whaddya say we do this together?!" (一緒にやろうぜ!, Isshoniyarouze!); 6. "I'm not a guinea pig, y'know?!" (オレは道具じゃねえんだぞ．．．?, Ore wa Dōgu Janē nda zo....?); 7. "It's now or never!!" (今のうちだ！, Imano Uchida!)
Ryu Yamada is an apathetic delinquent student at Suzaku High. One day, as he climbs the stairs, he passes by ace student Urara Shiraishi who glares at him, but he trips and they collide. He wakes up at the nurse's office and discovers he is in Shiraishi's body, and they have swapped bodies. Yamada learns that she led a lonely student life where she been bullied by her female schoolmates. They discover that the body swap is activated by a kiss. When they swap so that she can take Yamada's make-up exam, Yamada (in Shiraishi's body) beats up a peeper who took a picture of her changing, which ends up helping her get along with her female classmates. Student council vice-president Toranosuke Miyamura asks body-swapped Shiraishi out on a date and discovers their secret. He and Yamada (in Shiraishi's body) go to her house to investigate why Shiraishi does not want to go to college. He recruits Yamada and Shiraishi to the Supernatural Studies club. They learn that Yamada can swap bodies with anyone he kisses. Miyabi Itou, a big fan of the paranormal, wishes to join the club, but when she catches Yamada and Shiraishi kissing, she gets upset.
2	August 17, 2012	978-4-06-384727-7	May 5, 2015	978-1-63236069-4
8. "My Shiraishi-san" (俺の白石さんがー．．, Oreno Shiraishi-san ga-..); 9. "Crushing Tornado Kick!!!" (竜巻滅殺脚！！！, Tatumaki Messatsu Ashi!!!); 10. "Her face is so flushed!" (顔がほてってやがるんだよ....？, Kao ga Hotette ya Garu nda Yo....?); 11. "Now then, Suzuki-kun!" (ところで鈴木君！, Tokorode Suzuki-kun!); 12. "That is love" (それが愛です。, Sorega Aidesu); 13. "I want you to grant me this kiss" (俺とキスしていただきたい!!, Oreto Kisu Shite Itadakitai!!); 14. "Shingi Ikkyu" (心技一休, Shingi Ikkyuu); 15. "Oh...my...god!!" (キャーキャーキャーッ!, Kya-Kya-Kyattu!); 16. "They're soo soft!" (超やわらか〜い♥, Chō Yawaraka-i ♥)
Itou posts that Yamada and Shiraishi are a couple, prompting Yamada to body swap with Itou in order to try to quell the rumors. But the students dismiss Itou for being an unreliable gossip. Yamada then rescues the body-swapped Itou from trying to fight the delinquents who have demanded payment for selling her fake paranormal artifacts. The club discovers that the body swap powers track with Yamada's mind. When the club requests student council president Haruma Yamazaki for funds to buy a microwave, Yamazaki easily sees through their body-swapping shenanigans, but agrees to fund them if they can convince a stubborn archery club leader Karen Kimishima to allow her old club room to be demolished. Yamada and Itou find the old Supernatural Studies club room where they discover the second student council vice-president Nene Odagiri is in romantic cahoots with Ushio Igarashi. At the school field trip, when Yamada and Shiraishi swap bodies so the latter can study, Yamada ends up having fun bonding with the girls that he has her switch back so she can share in the social activity.
3	October 17, 2012	978-4-06-384754-3	July 28, 2015	978-1-63236070-0
17. "I will give you a kiss" (してあげる。, Shiteageru); 18. "Fidget Fidget" (モジモジ。, Mojimoji); 19. "Do whatever you want to me..." (好きにして．．．, Sukinishite...); 20. "Think about it" (ちゃんと考えて。, Channto Kanngaete); 21. "Wow. That hurt" (痛かったわ。, Itakattawa); 22. "Such a tragedy" (何て悲劇よ。, Nannte Higekiyo); 23. "Do you dislike me...?" (嫌かしら？, Iyakashira?); 24. "We gotta find 'em!" (探すんでしょーがッ。, Sagasun Desho-ga); 25. "Chirrup! Chirrup!" (ミーンミーン。, Mīn Mīn)
Nene Odagiri has a picture of Yamada rummaging through Shiraishi's stuff in the girls' sleeping quarters, and threatens to reveal the secret unless Shiraishi skips the upcoming mock exam. Yamada kisses Odagiri, but instead of swapping bodies, he acquires her ability to make the target fall in love with him. After thinking about Yamada all day, Odagiri realizes she has been hit with her own power; she and Igarashi agree to delete the picture so she can be restored to normal. Yamada shares the back story of how he and Igarashi were buddies in middle school, but fell out during high school when a fight with some delinquents got Yamada suspended for a week. The club visits the old clubhouse facility by the beach for summer break but Yamada must take supplementary classes. The club discovers that the witch powers cannot affect those already under a witch power.
4	December 17, 2012	978-4-06-384789-5	September 1, 2015	978-1-63236071-7
26. "What did you dooo?!" (何やってるぞな！？, Nani Yatteru zo na!?); 27. "Dejected" (ショボーン, Shobo-nn); 28. "Lather Lather" (わっしゃわっしゃ。, Wassha Wassha); 29. "Time to whip you into shape, Yamada!!" (山田訓練兵!, Yamada Kunnrennhei!); 30. "Boobs" (おっぱい。, Oppai); 31. "Odagiri's Breasts" (小田切のおっぱい, Odagiri no Oppai); 32. "Fssshhh! Pop! Pop!" (シュウウウプスプス, Shuuuu Pusu Pusu); 33. "A hot guy is here!" (イケメン来た!, Ikemen Kita!); 34. "Pay you with my body?" (体で払えって言うんだ?, Karadade Haraette Iunnda?)
A body-swapped Yamada attracts Meiko Otsuka, a student in Yamada's supplementary classes, who kisses him. Shiraishi deduces that Otsuka is actually a witch, but in order for the club to get access to an old clubroom, Yamada and his summer classmates must pass the exam, which means Yamada has to kiss Otsuka again and without scaring her. They learn that Otsuka's power is telepathy, and help them pass, although the club room turns out to be emptied. They later learn about a fourth witch, Maria Sarushima, who has the ability to see the future.
5	February 15, 2013	978-4-06-384819-9	November 17, 2015	978-1-63236072-4
35. "The power to see the future?!!" (未来が見える能力ー!?, Miraiga Mieru Nouryoku-!?); 36. "That got you aroused" (コーフンしてるー。, Ko-funn Shiteru-); 37. "Why don't you find out yourself?" (自分で調べれば?, Jibunnde Shirabereba?); 38. "There's a deeper reason behind this" (これには深い事情がある．．．, Kore ni wa Fukai Jijō ga ru...); 39. "Guhhh." (とろ～ん。, Toro~nn); 40. "THIS is what's going on...!" (こういう関係なの．．．!, Kouiu Kannkeinano．．．!); 41. "Might be a perv." (痴女なのかも。, Chijyona no Kamo.); 42. "The Rare Beasts of the World Exhibit" (世界の珍獣展, Sekai no Chinjū-ten); 43. "You're not gross, Yamada-kun." (山田君はキモくないわ。, Yamada-kun wa Kimokunai wa.)
6	April 17, 2013	978-4-06-384857-1	January 19, 2016	978-1-63236073-1
44. "Annoying and gross." (ウザキモいんですけど。, Uza Kimo in Desu Kedo.); 45. "Two hotties are here!!" (イケメン二人キター!, Ikemenn Futari Kita-!); 46. "A girl's jealousy is scary!!" (女のシット怖ぇ！, Onnnano Shitto Koele!); 47. "Strut..." (かっぽ...。, Kappo....); 48. "This is the truth!!" (これが真実よ!!!, Korega Shinnjitu yo!!!); 49. "Yamada, are you okay?!" (どうした山田ーっ!, Doushita Yamada-ttu!); 50. "Well, you did say that." (言ったのね。, Ittanone); 51. "There is one condition." (条件があります。, Jōken ga Arimasu.); Bonus chapter: "Turned on." (ムラムラ。, Muramura.)
7	June 17, 2013	978-4-06-384882-3	March 22, 2016	978-1-63236136-3
52. "Its ingredients are different!!" (素材がちがう!, Sozaiga Chigau!); 53. "Ugh. What a pain." (あーめんどくせえな。, A ̄Mendoku se e na.); 54. "Why, Yamada-san!" (あら 山田さん。, Ara Yamada-san.); 55. "Here we go!" (えい！, Ei!); 56. "Is that how you see them, Yamada-san?" (山田さんの絵心って。, Yamada-san no Egokoro tte.); 57. "Yeah, I do." (そうだよ俺は．．．。, Soudayo Oreha...); 58. "You want some, too?" (オマエも食うか?, Omaemo Kuuka?); 59. "Smooth talker, that one...!!" (調子のいいヤツだぜ!!, Choushino Ii Yatudaze!!); 60. "Clang!" (リンゴーン, Ringōn)
8	August 16, 2013	978-4-06-394916-2	May 31, 2016	978-1-63236137-0
61. "Just lemme kiss you!" (いいからさせろ！！, Īkara Sasero!!); 62. "I don't ever want to see you look that way again!" (二度と見たくねえから!!, Nidoto Mitakunē Kara!!); 63. "Shriek!" (ぴゃー！, Pya-!); 64. "What should we do?" (どうする？, Dousuru?); 65. "It's you..." (おまえか．．．．, Omaeka...); 66. "Don't Forget!" (忘れるな!, Wasureruna!); 67. "Underwear is where it's at!" (下着は素材重視だな。, Shitagi wa Sozai Jūshida na.); 68. "Look what we have here" (ざまあねぇ～っ, Zama a Nētsu); 69. "Is this guy stupid?" (バカかこいつは！！！, Bakaka Koitsu wa!!!)
9	September 17, 2013	978-4-06-394928-5	July 26, 2016	978-1-63236138-7
70. "Could it be me?!!" (アタシかーッ!, Atashi Ka~tsu!); 71. "Charge!" (強行突破だーッ！, Kyōkō Toppada~tsu!); 72. "Eek! A bug!" (キャッ 虫!!, Kyattu Mushi!!); 73. "Someplace we can really be alone" (行こーぜ, Iko-ze); 74. "You're a real creep!" (サイテーだな, Saite-dana); 75. "Pretty romantic, isn't it?" (ロマンがあるだろう？, Romanga Arudarou?); 76. "You still want to kiss, huh?" (キスがしたいのね, Kisuga Shitainone); special one-shot: "The Devil's Classroom" (魔王の教室, Maō no Kyōshitsu)
10	December 17, 2013	978-4-06-394986-5	September 20, 2016	978-1-63236139-4
77. "How rude!" (けしからん。, Keshikaran); 78. "Always inferior" (どう見ても劣化版...。, Dou Mitemo Rekkabann....); 79. "I'm a cool guy, aren't I?" (俺だってイケメンだろ！, Oredatte Ikemendaro!); 80. "Perverted, just perverted!" (チカンよチカン！, Chikanyo Chikan!); 81. "I'm watching a movie" (映画見てんの！, Eigawo Mitenno!); 82. "Students don't remember anything" (リカだけに理科準備室ー！, Rika Dake ni Rika Junbi-shitsu!); 83. "I have underwear" (パンツ持ってるし！, Pantu Motterushi!); 84. "That's the end of the club!" (廃部だな！！, Haibuda na!!); 85. "You wanna see her naked?!" (裸が見たいワケ！？, Hadakaga Mitaiwake!?)
11	March 17, 2014	978-4-06-395011-3	November 15, 2016	978-1-63236140-0
86. "Weakling!!!" (弱ーーーッ！！！, Yowa-!); 87. "What if we get cursed?!" (呪ろわれたらどうする！？, Norowa Retara Dō Suru!?); 88. "Is that commonly known?" (俗・・・・？, Zoku....?); 89. "No-underwear policy!! " (ノーパンにしてやるね！, No Pan ni Shiteyaru ne!); 90. "Downright awful!" (最悪だわ！！, Saiakuda wa!!); 91. "Tempura again!" (また天ぷらー！, Mata Tenpura-!); 92. "Tea!" (お茶！, Ocha!); 93. "In front" (前よ。, Mae Yo.); 94. "Shrimp!" (チビじゃん。, Chibijan)
12	May 16, 2014	978-4-06-395080-9	January 3, 2017	978-1-63236141-7
95. "Staaare" (じーっ。, Jii~.); 96. "Like a ninja" (忍者みたい。, Ninja Mitai.); 97. "Susshi" (スッシー。, Susshī); 98. "Her jugs are ginormous!" (胸デカッ。, Mune Deka); 99. "Care for a bean-jam bun?" (あんパン食べますー？, An Pan Tabemasu~?); 100. "Really pissed off" (激おこだけど？, Geki Okodakedo?); 101. "Take care" (気をつけて。, Kiwotsukete); 102. "See what his real intentions are!" (下心が見えたもん。, Shitagokoro ga Mieta Mon.)
13	July 17, 2014	978-4-06-395126-4	March 7, 2017	978-1-63236142-4
103. "Google it later!" (あとでググりな！, Ato de Guguri na!); 104. "Going commando as a hobby" (シュミでノーパン。, Shumi de Nōpan.); 105. "Showwie!" (スマネっしー。, Sumanesshi~.); 106. "She's got a dirty mind" (エロいからなー。, Eroikarana~); 107. "He looks bored" 108. "A sorta bittersweet alliance" (なんだか切ない同盟。, Nandaka Setsunai Dōmei.); 109. "The Masked JK" (JK仮面。, JK Kamen); 110. "Lame..." (ダサ...., Dasa....)
14	September 17, 2014	978-4-06-395190-5	July 4, 2017	978-1-63236354-1
111. "She does have a nice body" (ナイスバディだしな。, Naisu Badi da Shi na); 112. "In the Abyss" (奈落の底だろ。, Naraku no Soko Daro); 113. "10 Years Too Early" (10年早いけど。, 10 Nen Hayai Kedo); 114. "Perfect, right?" (完璧だろう？, Kanpeki Daro u?); 115. "I'm on a diet" (ダイエット中だから, Daietto Chū da Kara); 116. "No one asked you!" (余計なお世話よ!!, Yokeinaosewa Yo!!); 117. "Gotta get back" (戻らなきゃ, Modoranakya); 118. "You sawww!!" (見たなぁぁぁ!!, Mita naaaa~!!); 119. "Do your hair up like me!" (同じ髪型にしよー?, Onaji Kamigata ni Shiyo~?)
15	December 17, 2014	978-4-06-395264-3	February 6, 2018	978-1-63236523-1
120. "Doubt" (ダウト!!, Dauto!!); 121. "He likes big boobs" (巨乳好きだって。, Kyonyū Suki Datte); 122. "Call me Lincoln" (リンカーンデース, Rinkān Dēsu); 123. "The panic alarm is ringing" (防犯ブザーが鳴ってるぞ？, Bōhan Buzā ga Natteru zo?); 124. "Have your way with me" (好きにしろ・・・, Suki ni Shiro...); 125. "I only have 400 yen" (400円しかねぇけど！, 400-en Shikane~kedo!); 126. "I also have a rival" (ライバルがいるんだぜ？, Raibaru ga Iru nda Ze?); 127. "Sex appeal" (お色気!!, Oiroke!!); 128. "Makes me care more" (Gyaku ni ki ni Naru na)
16	March 17, 2015	978-4-06-395347-3	July 24, 2018	978-1-63236583-5
129. "That's all" (それだけだが？, Sore Dakedaga?); 130. "A lot on my mind" (アタマがいっぱいでね！, Atama ga Ippaide ne!); 131. "Scarier than a ghost" (おばけより怖い・・・, Obake Yori Kowai...); 132. "Can't you tell?" (見ればわかるでしょ。, Mireba Wakarudesho.); 133. "Come at me" (かかって来なさい!!, Kakatte ki Nasai!!); 134. "Too hot to handle" (猫舌か!!, Nekojita ka!!); 135. "'Cause I said we're on a break" (距離を置こうって言ったから, Kyori o Okou tte Ittakara); 136. "One reeeally annoying power" (迷惑な能力ね, Meiwakuna Nōryoku ne); 137. "I'm not so sure about that" (ドーデショー？, Dōdeshō?)
17	May 15, 2015	978-4-06-395396-1	January 15, 2019	978-1-63236584-2
138. "You weren't gonna kiss me?" (キスしてくるんじゃねぇのかよ！？, Kisu Shite Kuru n Jane~ no ka yo!?); 139. "It turns me on!" (コーフンするんで♥, Kōfun Surunde ♥); 140. (No title) (さもなくば除隊だ!!, Sa mo Nakuba Jotaida!!); 141. "Making a fool out of me" (バカにする気か！, Baka ni Suru ki ka!); 142. "Gimme some cola!" (コーラとってくれ, Kōra Totte Kure); 143. "We say "Move"" (「指す」というんだ, 'Sasu' to iu nda); 144. "Irresistible Chivalry!" (圧倒的な包容力だ・・・, Attōtekina Hōyō Ryokuda); 145. "It's Tough Being Such A Stud..." (イケメンって罪だよなぁ・・。, Ikemen tte Tsumida yo nā...); 146. "You and me! Super bestieees!" (なっかよっしこよしっ。, Nakka Yosshi ko Yoshi~)
18	July 17, 2015	978-4-06-395438-8	January 15, 2019	978-1-63236584-2
147. "Permission to rub her boobs!!" (おっぱいを揉ませてもらおう!!, Oppai o Moma Sete Moraou!!); 148. "Pretty little bear!" (プリティーくまさんです！, Puritī Kuma-san Desu!); 149. "Another gross picture?!!" (またグロ画像かよ!?, Mata Guro Gazō ka yo!?); 150. "I'm not bald!!" (ハゲじゃねぇ!!, Hage Jane~!!); 151. "In London" (ロンドンにいたんだ, Rondon ni Itanda); 152. "Two-timing!!" (二股疑惑のほうだよ・・!, Futamata Giwaku no Hōda yo..!); 153. "I promised you!" (約束したからな！, Yakusoku Shitakara na!); 154. "What a huge success!!" (大成功だぞー！！, Taiseikōda zo~!!); 155. "Always..." (いつも・・・, Itsumo...)
19	September 17, 2015	978-4-06-395495-1	July 23, 2019	978-1-63236632-0
156. "This is a toy gun." (これはモデルガンだ, Kore wa Moderugan da); 157. "Show No Mercy!!" (容赦はしない!!, Yōsha ha Shinai!!); 158. "Haruko-Chan!" (晴子ちゃん!, Haruko-chan!); 159. "Off to do some randori!" (乱取りしてくるね～♥, Randori Shite Kuru ne~♥); 160. "I...I don't believe it!!" (あ‥‥ありえねぇ!!, A‥‥ ariene!!); 161. "It's so flamingo-colored!!" (めっちゃフラミンゴ色だ!!, Metcha Furamingo-iroda!!); 162. "Blamed me for the whole underwear thing!!" (パンツのことで責められて!!, Pantsu no Koto de Seme Rarete!!); 163. "I might get dumped, huh?" (フラレちゃうのかしらね‥?, Furare Chau no Kashira ne‥?); 164. "I want you to touch me... ♥" (さわってほしいの‥, Sawatte Hoshī no‥)
20	November 17, 2015	978-4-06-395545-3	July 23, 2019	978-1-63236632-0
165. "To be clear, I'm not gonna give it to you!" (言っておくけどあげないよ?, Itte Okukedo Agenai yo?); 166. "Kiss as much as we want!" (キスし放題だな!, Kisu Shihō Daida na!); 167. "It's like I became senpai's wife!" (妻になったも同然ですね～～, Tsuma ni Natta mo Dōzen Desu ne~~); 168. "You're not a cute kohai at all!" (かわいくない後輩だな。, Kawaikunai Kōhaida na.); 169. "Denied!" (拒否します, Kyohi Shimasu); 170. "I'll definitely come back...!" (戻ってくるからさ‥‥!, Modotte Kurukara sa‥‥!); 171. "It's a bloodbath!" (修羅場デスネー!, Shuraba Desu nē!); 172. "Stop fighting over meee. ♥" (やめてほしいですぅ～～, Yamete Hoshīde su~~)
21	January 15, 2016	978-4-06-395581-1	January 14, 2020	978-1-63236900-0
173. "You're a stalker, aren't you?!" (ストーカーでしょ‥‥?, Sutōkā Desho‥‥?); 174. "You're scared!" (怖いんだー。, Kowai nda.); 175. "You're looking for a secret notebook?" (秘密のメモを探してる?, Himitsu no Memo o Sagashi Teru?); 176. "Wet's bweeech!!" (レッツブシャー!!, Rettsu Bushā!!); 177. "She's a high school girl, y'know?" (女子高生だぞ!?, Joshikō sei Dazo!?); 178. "Right here" (ココよ。, Koko yo.); 179. "Trembling 'cause I can't talk to you." (話せなくてふるえる。, Hanasenakute Furueru.); 180. "I give it a four." (4点。, 4-ten.); 181. "Although I always knew." (わかっていたけどね。, Waka tte Itakedo ne.)
22	March 17, 2016	978-4-06-395622-1	January 14, 2020	978-1-63236900-0
182. "Well, it's true." (事実ですもの。, Jijitsu Desu Mono.); 183. "Punch me, will you?" (殴ってくれないか?, Nagutte Kurenai ka?); 184. "Who wants mint chocolate chip?!" (チョコミントがいい人ー!?, Choko Minto ga ī Hito!?); 185. "What can't be learned at school" (学校じゃできない勉強。, Gakkō ja Dekinai Benkyō.); 186. "Are you gonna come in too?" (山田君も入る?, Yamada-kun mo Hairu?); 187. "To our brand spanking new Poetry Club!" (ポエム部まで!, Poemu-bu Made!); 188. "Should I take my pants off too?" (下も脱ぎましょうか?, Shita mo Nugimashō ka?); 189. "Perfect as my rival" (敵として申し分ないな。, Teki to Shite Mōshiwakenai na.); 190. "You mean hosts?!" (ホストじゃん!!, Hosuto Jan!!)
23	May 17, 2016	978-4-06-395674-0	January 26, 2021	978-1-64651011-5
191. "S...so adorbs!!" (カ‥‥カワユス!!, Ka‥‥ Kawayusu!!); 192. "Ya li'l hoodrats!" (シャバ僧がぁあああ!, Shabazō Gaaaaa!); 193. "Homemade at that...?" (しかも手作り‥‥?, Shikamo Tedzukuri‥‥?); 194. "I wish I had a boyfriend..." (彼氏ほしいなぁ‥‥。, Kareshi Hoshī nā‥‥.); 195. "My chest sorta aches..." (胸がうずくっていうか‥‥。, Mune ga Uzuku tte iu ka‥‥.); 196. "You surprised?" (You surprise?); 197. "Do what?" (ヤるって何を?, Yaru Ttenani o?); 198. "And there are sea cucumbers." (ナマコいるしね。, Namako Irushi ne.); 199. "I dunno about this..." (ダメかしら‥‥?, Dame Kashira‥‥?)
24	July 15, 2016	978-4-06-395714-3	January 26, 2021	978-1-64651011-5
200. "Ocean front!!" (オーシャンフロントだ!!!, Ōshan Furonto da!!!); 201. "Paradiiise ♥" (パーラダーイス, Pāradāisu); 202. "And I'll get to have a boyfriend?!" (彼氏はできますかね!?, Kareshi wa Dekimasu ka ne!?); 203. "Sensitive to trends." (トレンドに敏感だよな。, Torendo ni Binkanda yo na.); 204. "Kinda unoriginal, huh?" (芸がないっスね。, Gei ga Naissu ne.); 205. "Are you all pimping me out?!" (全員ヒモか!!, Zen'in Himo ka!!); 206. "You've ended up this way." (そうなっちゃうんですよ。, Sō Natchau Ndesu yo.); 207. "Buy white radish on your way home!" (ダイコン買ってきてほしい。, Daikon Katte Kite Hoshī.); 208. "You better thank me!" (私に感謝しなさいよ!, Watashi ni Kansha shi Nasai yo!)
25	October 17, 2016	978-4-06-395769-3	February 22, 2022	978-1-64651015-3
209. "You keep giving me that look!!" (そういう目で見てますよね!?, Sōiu me de Mitemasu yo ne!?); 210. "Don't die on me!!" (死んじゃダメ!!, Shinja Dame!!); 211. "I was reborn!" (生まれ変わったんです!, Umarekawatta Ndesu!); 212. "First time a girl's cried!!" (泣かれたのははじめてだ!!, Naka Reta no wa Hajimeteda!!); 213. "I hate you!!" (大ッ嫌い!!, Dai Ggirai!!); 214. "Sentenced to tickling...!!" (くすぐりの刑に処する‥!!, Kusugurinokei ni Shosuru‥!!); 215. "You just wanna get freaky, don't you?!!" (ヤりたいだけなんですよねー!!?, Yaritai Dakena Ndesu yo ne!!?); 216. "I said "Destiny"!" (破壊する。, Hakai Suru.); 217. "I'm ready...!♥" (いいわよ‥, Ī wa Yo‥)
26	December 16, 2016	978-4-06-395830-0	February 22, 2022	978-1-64651015-3
218. "So you guys are incompetent?!" (え～～無能?, E~~munō?); 219. "Was there tongue?" (舌入れられたか?, Shita Haire Rareta ka?); 220. "Or not." (まだみたい。, Mada Mitai.); 221. "It's Yamada he's after...!!!" (狙いは"山田"だ‥!!, Nerai wa "Yamada" da‥!!); 222. "I'm a free man!" (オレは自由なんだ!, Ore wa Jiyūna nda!); 223. "Are you scared, by any chance?" (もしかして怖い?, Moshikashite Kowai?); 224. "They could never be around a guy like me." (一緒にはいられねーか。, Issho ni Haira Rene ̄ka.); 225. "Lemme give you a hand." (私も手伝うわ。, Watashi mo Tetsudau wa.); 226. ""Grade point average"?" (ヒョーテーヘイキン?, Hyōtē Heikin?)
27	February 17, 2017	978-4-06-395873-7	January 24, 2023	978-1-64651016-0
227. "Simple, basic questions" (簡単な基礎問題よ。, Kantan'na Kiso Mondai yo.); 228. "To be young!" (青春だねー!, Seishunda ne!); 229. "The power of psychology!" (心理学の力さ!, Shinrigaku no Chikara sa!); 230. "I'm gonna do the same!" (私もそうするわ!, Watashi mo sō Suru wa!); 231. "Enjoying your summer break?" (夏休みエンジョイしてるかー?, Natsuyasumi Enjoi shi Teru ka?); 232. "We're retired." (引退してるけど?, Intai shi Terukedo?); 233. "The girl in this photo..." (この写真の子‥‥。, Kono Shashin no Ko‥‥.); 234. "Are you sure?" (違くね?, Iku ne?); 235. "Don't tell Shiraishi, okay?" (白石には言うなよ?, Shiraishi ni wa iu na yo?)
28	April 17, 2017	978-4-06-395920-8	January 24, 2023	978-1-64651016-0
236. "I don't know anyone like that..." (存じ上げませんが‥。, Zonjiagemasenga‥.); 237. "The original witch" ("はじまりの魔女"。, "Hajimari no Majo".); 238. "I miss her" (白石に会いたい。, Shiraishi ni Aitai.); 239. "I am not boring!!" (つまらなくなんかないッ!!!, Tsumaranaku Nanka Nai!!!); 240. "So shameless!!" (ずうずうしすぎだろ!!, Zūzūshi Sugidaro!!); 241. "I'll leave the rest to you guys!" (あとは頼んだぜ‥!!, Ato wa Tanonda ze‥!!); 242. "It's been ten years...!!" (あれから10年‥‥か。, Are Kara 10-nen‥‥ ka.); 243. "Final Episode" (最終話 むかーし、むかし。, Saishū-Banashi Mukashi, Mukashi.)
