= Hilcrhyme =

Japanese hip-hop duo

Hilcrhyme ヒルクライム
- Origin: Niigata Prefecture, Japan
- Genres: Reggae; hip hop; J-pop
- Years active: 2004–present
- Label: Universal Music Japan
- Members: Toc
- Past members: DJ Katsu
- Website: hilcrhyme.com

Hilcrhyme (ヒルクライム, Hirukuraimu) is a Japanese two member hip-hop group. The band's name is a pun on the Japanese pronunciation of hillclimb and the word rhyme. They are best known for their 2009 hit song "Shunkashūtō", which has been certified for 1,000,000 cellphone digital downloads and 1,000,000 ringtone downloads separately. The group was named the New Artist of the Year at the 24th Japan Gold Disc Awards.

In December 2017, group member DJ Katsu was arrested for marijuana possession and subsequently left the group.

== Biography ==
Hilcrhyme first met when Toc performed at a regular music event called Nettaiya, organised by DJ Katsu. After the event finished in 2005, the pair focused working together as a duo, mostly centering their activities around Niigata.

The pair's first official release together came in March 2007, when they released Nettaiya, a demo album. In July 2008, the group released their debut single, "Mō Byebye", independently through Nao Plan management. Hilcrhyme debuted as a major label artist a later, under Universal.

The group's second major label single, "Shunkashūtō", became a massive digital hit in Japan and brought the group to fame. It has currently sold more than 1,000,000 cellphone digital downloads, 1,000,000 ringtone downloads and 100,000 PC downloads. Since then, the band's next single (a re-release of "Mō Byebye") and their debut single, "Jun'ya to Manami", have been certified for being downloaded more than 100,000 times as a cellphone download.

Their song "Loose Leaf" was selected as the theme of the 2010 drama adaption of manga Flunk Punk Rumble, becoming their first drama tie-in theme song.

On December 1, 2017, group member DJ Katsu was arrested on charges of suspected marijuana possession. On December 4, the group's recording contract with Universal Music was cancelled. DJ Katsu's management contract with the company was also cancelled.

== Discography ==
=== Albums ===
Year	Album Information	Oricon Albums Charts	Reported sales
2007	Nettaiya (熱帯夜, Tropical Night): Released: March, 2007; Independently released demo album; Formats: Free download	—	—
2010	Recital (リサイタル, Risaitaru): Released: January 13, 2010; Label: Universal Music Japan (UPCH-9539); Formats: CD, digital download	2	202,000
2010	Message: Released: November 24, 2010; Label: Universal Music Japan (UPCH-9606); Formats: CD, digital download	—	—
2010	Rising: Released: December 7, 2011; Label: Formats: CD, digital download	—	—
"—" denotes releases that did not chart or were not released in that region.

=== Singles ===
Release	Title	Notes	Chart positions			Oricon sales	Album
Release	Title	Notes	Oricon Singles Charts	Billboard Japan Hot 100	RIAJ digital tracks	Oricon sales	Album
2008	"Mō Bye Bye" (もうバイバイ, Bye Bye Once More)	Independent release.	80	—	—	1,800	Recital
2009	"Jun'ya to Manami" (純也と真菜実, Junya and Manami)		24	53	38	8,000	Recital
2009	"Shunkashūtō" (春夏秋冬, Four Seasons)		6	2	1	138,000	Recital
2009	"Mō Bye Bye" (もうバイバイ, Bye Bye Once More)	Major label re-release.	18	21	3	14,000	Recital
2010	"Daijōbu" (大丈夫, Alright)		6	6	1	35,000	Message
2010	"Loose Leaf" (ルーズリーフ, Rūzu Rīfu)		7	9	1	35,000	Message
2011	"Okubyo na Ookami" (臆病な狼, Cowardly Wolf)		—	—	—		Rising
2011	"No One"		—	—	—		Rising
2011	"Personal COLOR" (パーソナルCOLOR, Paasonaru COLOR)		—	—	—		Rising
"—" denotes releases that did not chart or were not released in that region.
