= Miki Yoshikawa =

Japanese manga artist

- Born: October 2, 1982 (age 44) Japan
- Area: Manga artist
- Notable works: Flunk Punk Rumble, Yamada and the Seven Witches

Miki Yoshikawa (吉河 美希, Yoshikawa Miki; born October 2, 1982) is a Japanese manga artist best known for her manga series Flunk Punk Rumble, Yamada-kun and the Seven Witches and A Couple of Cuckoos and their accompanying anime series. Her debut work was a one-shot called Glory Days in Kodansha's Magazine Special. She assisted Hiro Mashima on Rave Master and Fairy Tail. In 2005, she released the comedy one-shot Flunk Punk Rumble in Shonen Magazine Wonder, which was later made into a short series and eventually publicized in Kodansha's Weekly Shōnen Magazine from 2006 to 2011, with a total of 211 chapters. In 2012, she released Yamada-kun and the Seven Witches, which has to date sold over 3 million copies, and was adapted into a live-action drama series and a TV anime series. In 2015, Yoshikawa attended Anime Expo as a guest.

== Style and influence ==
At Anime Expo 2015, Yoshikawa said that she was inspired by Dragon Ball, and would try to copy some of Akira Toriyama's panels and manuscripts. She credits Hiro Mashima for "teaching her everything I know" while she was assisting him on Fairy Tail. Yoshikawa worked as a manga assistant under Mashima for about four years.

In the Natalie interview, Yoshikawa said that she had thought of the body swapping idea in the Yankee-kun days, and had researched some medical books on the differences between men and women, both physically and emotionally, but generally went with it because she liked the idea. "It just kind of came to me, but I was wondering how a guy finding himself in a girl's body would react, and the reverse". She treats a body-swapped character as an entirely different character. When it was noted that the main characters for both of her works were delinquents, Yoshikawa replied that those types of characters came easily for her, as she grew up in the lower end of Tokyo. The characters and their names are not based on her friends so that they can act crazy. At Anime Expo 2015, she said that the characters reflect different aspects of herself.

With regards to drawing in Yamada-kun, she tries to vary each kiss, but mostly uses the side angle to make sure it comes through. With regards to kisses between members of the same gender, she replied that wasn't intended to target any specific demographic but just "an inevitable outcome". At the time of Anime Expo, she said she had five assistants. She does her drawing by hand in black-and-white, and uses the computer for the filling in colors. She spends about half of her time on story, and the other half on actual drawing.

== Works ==
Title	Japanese title/Romaji	Date	Volumes	Magazine
Flunk Punk Rumble	ヤンキー君とメガネちゃん; Yankī-kun to Megane-chan	October 18, 2006 – May 18, 2011	23	Weekly Shōnen Magazine
Yamada-kun and the Seven Witches	山田くんと7人の魔女; Yamada-kun to Nananin no Majo	February 22, 2012 – February 22, 2017	28	Weekly Shōnen Magazine
A Couple of Cuckoos	カッコウの許嫁; Kakkou no Īnazuke	January 29, 2020 – present	25	Weekly Shōnen Magazine
Hiragi-san's House of Vampires	柊さんちの吸血事情; Hiiragi-san no Kyūketsu Jijō	October 8, 2021 – present	6	Bessatsu Shōnen Magazine
