= Hiragi-san's House of Vampires =

Japanese manga series

- First tankōbon volume cover

柊さんちの吸血事情 (Hiiragi-san Chi no Kyūketsu Jijō)
- Genre: Romantic comedy
- Manga
- Written by: Miki Yoshikawa
- Published by: Kodansha
- English publisher: Kodansha (digital)
- Magazine: Bessatsu Shōnen Magazine
- Original run: October 8, 2021 – present
- Volumes: 6
- Anime television series
- Studio: TMS Entertainment (planning and production) (Note: Under the "Unlimited Produce by TMS" brand)
- icon

Hiragi-san's House of Vampires (Japanese: 柊さんちの吸血事情, Hepburn: Hiiragi-san Chi no Kyūketsu Jijō) is a Japanese manga series written and illustrated by Miki Yoshikawa. It has been serialized in Kodansha's shōnen manga magazine Bessatsu Shōnen Magazine since October 2021. An anime television series adaptation has been announced.

== Media ==
=== Manga ===
Written and illustrated by Miki Yoshikawa, Hiragi-san's House of Vampires was first published as a one-shot in Kodansha's shōnen manga magazine Weekly Shōnen Magazine on September 11, 2019. The series started in Bessatsu Shōnen Magazine on October 8, 2021. Kodansha has collected its chapters into individual tankōbon volumes. The first volume was released on May 17, 2022. As of November 17, 2025, six volumes have been released.

Kodansha added the series to its K Manga digital service in May 2023.

==== Volumes ====
No.	Japanese release date	Japanese ISBN
1	May 17, 2022	978-4-06-527926-7
2	December 16, 2022	978-4-06-529988-3
3	August 17, 2023	978-4-06-532605-3
4	April 17, 2024	978-4-06-535164-2
5	January 17, 2025	978-4-06-538058-1
6	November 17, 2025	978-4-06-541558-0
7	December 16, 2026	978-4-06-546218-8

=== Anime ===
In October 2026, it was announced that the manga will receive an anime television series adaptation planned and produced by TMS Entertainment, under the "Unlimited Produce by TMS" brand.
