= Hillclimbing (disambiguation) =

Hillclimbing is a motorsport

Hillclimbing may also refer to:

- Hillclimbing (motorcycling)
- Hillclimbing (cycling)
- Hillclimbing (railway)
- Hill climbing, an optimization algorithm in mathematics

== See also ==
- Hillwalking
- Mountaineering
- Hilcrhyme, a Japanese hip-hop duo
- Newport Antique Auto Hill Climb, a racing event in Newport, Indiana
- Hill Climb Racing (video game), video game
