= Flunk Punk Rumble =

Japanese manga series and its adaptations

- First tankōbon volume cover, featuring Daichi Shinagawa (left) and Hana Adachi (right)

ヤンキー君とメガネちゃん (Yankī-kun to Megane-chan)
- Genre: Romantic comedy
- Manga
- Written by: Miki Yoshikawa
- Published by: Kodansha
- English publisher: SG: Chuang Yi
- Imprint: Shōnen Magazine Comics
- Magazine: Weekly Shōnen Magazine
- Original run: October 18, 2006 – May 18, 2011
- Volumes: 23
- Television drama
- Written by: Yuko Nagata
- Music by: Teruyuki Nobuchiba
- Studio: TBS
- Original network: JNN (TBS)
- Original run: April 23, 2010 – June 25, 2010
- Episodes: 10
- Original video animation

Yankee-kun na Yamada-kun to Megane-chan to Majo
- Directed by: Tomoki Takuno
- Written by: Michiko Yokote
- Music by: Masaru Yokoyama
- Studio: Liden Films
- Released: August 26, 2015
- Runtime: 7 minutes
- icon

Flunk Punk Rumble, known in Japan as Yankī-kun to Megane-chan (ヤンキー君とメガネちゃん), is a Japanese manga series written and illustrated by Miki Yoshikawa. It was serialized in Kodansha's shōnen manga magazine Weekly Shōnen Magazine from October 2006 to May 2011, with its chapters collected in 23 tankōbon volumes. The manga was released in English by Chuang Yi in Singapore; only three volumes were released.

A 10-episode television drama adaptation was broadcast from April to June 2010. A crossover anime short with Yoshikawa's other series, Yamada-kun and the Seven Witches, titled Yamada-kun to 7-nin no Majo × Yankī-kun to Megane-chan, was released in August 2015.

== Plot ==
Daichi Shinagawa was just a yankī (Japanese term for delinquent) who wanted nothing to do with his high school life. Hana Adachi, the dedicated class representative, however would not allow it and constantly bothers him to be involved in school life. Shinagawa is first confused on why she keeps pestering him until he discovers her secret. While she may look like a typical class representative stereotype, Adachi is actually not very smart and lacks common sense, and Shinagawa eventually learns that Adachi is a former delinquent. Regretting being a yankī during her middle school years, Adachi decides to change her ways to achieve her dream of becoming the best class representative. She decides to help Shinagawa so he will not continue to make the same mistake that she did. Thus begins the adventures of these two unlikely friends and their classmates at Mon Shiro High School.

== Characters ==
=== Main characters ===
Daichi Shinagawa (品川 大地, Shinagawa Daichi)
Voiced by: Yūki Ono
Portrayed by: Hiroki Narimiya, Amon Kabe (young)
Shinagawa, nicknamed "Yankī-kun", is a temperamental delinquent who reforms after meeting Hana Adachi, a former delinquent. Initially indifferent to school, he eventually becomes co-vice president, excels in math, and protects his friends. Once a top student, he was expelled for defending his rival, Shizuku Hachioji, leading to his rebellious phase. He develops complex feelings for Adachi—admiring her kindness but frustrated by her antics—later realizing she was the girl he noticed years prior. After university, he teaches at their high school and lives with Adachi, though their relationship status remains ambiguous.
Hana Adachi (足立 花, Adachi Hana)
Voiced by: Yōko Hikasa
Portrayed by: Riisa Naka
Adachi, the class representative and later student council president, appears studious but struggles academically and lacks common sense. A former delinquent held back a year, she initially clings to Shinagawa, pushing him to engage in school life. To blend in, she adopts a meek appearance—pigtails and fake glasses—though abandoning them briefly boosts her popularity. Her violent past remains infamous, even intimidating yakuza. After moving in with her grandmother (a similarly chaotic figure), she later returns home for Shinagawa's sake. Post-graduation, she reunites with him as a transfer student, and though they live together, both deny romantic involvement.
Seiya Chiba (千葉 星矢, Chiba Seiya)
Voiced by: Tomoaki Maeno
Portrayed by: Yu Koyanagi
Chiba is a tall, bespectacled student with a scar across his forehead, his intimidating appearance belies a timid, childish nature. After a gang confrontation left him a hikikomori, Adachi and Shinagawa unknowingly resolve his fears by defeating the gang. Though highly intelligent (scoring perfect marks), he initially refuses to attend school, claiming fear of Shinagawa—really seeking Adachi's attention. Pressured by Shinagawa's ultimatum, he returns, later becoming student council treasurer. His obvious crush on Makoto goes unnoticed by her until they reunite as a couple four years after graduation.
Rinka Himeji (姫路 凜風, Himeji Rinka)
Voiced by: Mika Kikuchi
Portrayed by: Haruna Kawaguchi
Adachi's former kōhai and middle school subordinate, Himeji transfers to Mon Shiro as the student council secretary. Nicknamed "The Bloody Pantheress", she remains a delinquent despite Adachi's reformation, initially treating Shinagawa and Chiba as underlings. Estranged from her adoptive family, she moves in with Adachi after being disowned. Though hostile toward Shinagawa at first, she later develops feelings for him. Skilled in household chores, she often cleans for the group. After graduation, she trains to inherit the Himeji Corporation, her family's business.
Gaku Izumi (和泉 岳, Izumi Gaku)
Voiced by: Takuma Terashima
Portrayed by: Kanata Hongo
Izumi, an honor student ranking second in his grade, challenges Adachi for student council president. A former legendary biker gang member, he reformed to focus on academics but retains his competitive spirit. Though the first shown capable of blocking Adachi's attacks (barely), he loses their fight and accepts the vice presidency, sharing the role with Shinagawa. Their rivalry persists as they constantly clash over superiority. Despite his fearsome past, he remains excitable and nostalgic for his gang attire while being sensitive about his short stature. Four years later, he pursues legal studies.

=== Other Mon Shiro students ===
Kasukabe (春日部)
A classmate of Shinagawa and Adachi. She is one of the few girls that talks to Shinagawa without being afraid of him. She is dating Sagami, a student from another school.
Makoto Kumagaya (熊谷 真, Kumagaya Makoto)
A student in Shinagawa's year who stopped going to school after her childhood friend got a girlfriend. She remained at home and immersed herself in online gaming. When her childhood friend got worried and asked the student council to help her, they initially thought she was a boy because her game avatar was male. She becomes good friends with the student council members after convincing her to go back to school. It is mentioned that she still occasionally plays the online game with Shinagawa. She is shown to be a very outgoing type of girl and is unaware that Chiba has since developed a crush on her.
Kawasaki (川崎)
Kumagaya's childhood friend who is concerned about her playing games and not attending school. She was upset that she would lose him as he grew apart and started having interest in girls, leading to her behavior.
Hikaru Akita (秋田 光, Akita Hikaru)
A third-year student and the former student council president who is always seen with a fan in his hand. A seemingly easy-going person, Akita is a former delinquent who will fly in a rage upon being called a girl. When he is in this state, even Shinagawa and Izumi fear him. It is shown that the only way to get him to calm down is for a girl to kick him in his private parts. Akita's girlfriend is Shinagawa's older sister and they both attend the same university.
Itsuki Kagawa (香川 樹, Kagawa Itsuki)
A student who transfers into Mon Shiro solely to be in the student council, which he believes is a bōsōzoku (biker gang) because his former boss Izumi is in it. He later runs for student council president hoping to make Mon Shiro the strongest. After becoming president he is surprised to find that, while the rest of the student council are under the impression that Adachi does nothing, she in fact keeps detailed records of every single student that attends Mon Shiro, keeping special tabs on those students who are in danger of expulsion so that she can help them to enjoy school life as she has. She entrusts him with these duties, telling him that he will be able to handle it because he has his friends there to help him, just like her friends have helped her.
Akira Kitami (北見 明, Kitami Akira)
A second-year delinquent struggling to appear approachable, he befriends Kagawa after an initial fight. Hoping to expand his social circle, he runs for student council vice president alongside Anna, ultimately winning when opponents withdraw. Following the sports festival, he develops feelings for Anna and starts a daily after-school tradition of visiting an ice cream parlor with her and Kagawa.
Nacchi (ナッキ, Nakki) and Macchi (マッキ, Makki)
First introduced as a part of Shinagawa's trash team during the festival. "Guy-gals" that are never apart, Nacchi and Macchi idolize Shinagawa. They later run for the secretary and treasurer positions in the student council believing they are Shinagawa's successors. After winning the election, they are shocked and dismayed to find that all the paper work for the student council is done solely by their positions, previously held by Chiba and Himeji.
Anna Ichinomiya (一宮 杏奈, Ichinomiya Anna)
She first appears as an air head who loves hair and makeup retaking a test alone with Shinagawa as the test proctor. Later on, they discover she won a medal for her cheerleading skills and eventually helps them practice for the sports festival. Though her teaching is effective in the long run, she is prone to kicking and punching if anyone is to interrupt her. She eventually becomes student council vice president along with Kitami.
Sakura Miyagi (宮城県 さくら, Miyagi Sakura)
A weak-bodied punk rocker girl selected as the class representative for the culture festival alongside Shinagawa. She rarely came to class due to her condition until Shinagawa convinced her to come to class regularly. She soon developed some feelings for him, but finds out about the girl he likes after meeting Subaru Mito. She is the one who sets up Shinagawa into seeing Adachi without her glasses and braids on, and tells him that the person he is looking for is Adachi.
Shouin Suzuka (鈴鹿 松胤, Suzuka Shōin)
A student opposing Kagawa in the council elections, he presents himself as a model student but secretly aims to purge delinquents from Mon Shiro. The son of a prominent politician, he orchestrates a smear campaign against Kagawa's group while maintaining plausible deniability. His schemes collapse after Adachi exposes his delinquent past and defeats him in a fight. Following this confrontation, he abandons underhanded tactics and later assists Adachi's group, establishing an uneasy but cooperative relationship.
Kashiwa Koume (小梅 柏, Koume Kashiwa)
An entertainer and student who runs for vice president during the student council elections. She has the second best grades in her year. Like her fellow candidates, Kashiwa is a former delinquent. She reconciles with their opponents after being beaten by Adachi.
Aizu Takeshi (武 会津, Takeshi Aizu)
A model and student who runs for vice president alongside Kashiwa during the student council elections. He has the third best grades in his year. Like his fellow candidates, Aizu is a former delinquent. He reconciles with their opponents after being beaten by Adachi.
Computer Club Boys
Two geek students in the computer club who first appeared during the student council's attempt to get Makoto out of the gaming world. They depend on Shinagawa guarding from delinquents when they walk outside of school. Shinagawa trains them to be more confident so that they no longer have to depend on him. However, even though they shock the entire school with their cool and confident looks, they are beaten back to their wimpy selves by a delinquent who was not fazed by their new looks, forcing Shinagawa to help them yet again. Izumi then tells Shinagawa that to them Shinagawa is not a bodyguard but a friend.

=== Other characters ===
Shizuku Hachioji (八王子 雫, Hachioji Shizuku)
Daichi's former classmate and once an arch-rival, but after Daichi is kicked out from school, she has always kept and hoped to reunite with Daichi. She is disappointed with the fall of Daichi but nonetheless still keeps believing on him.
Sagami (相模)
A delinquent from the all-boys Ageha Technical High School. He first appears when he and his gang try to find Shinagawa at his high school after having a fight with him. Adachi helps Shinagawa escape but were soon found by Sagami's gang. Adachi attacks him when he harasses her, and when the gang realizes who she is, they flee in terror. He is dating Kasukabe thanks to Adachi helping him confess his feeling for Kasukabe, on the condition that he cleans up his act in the future.
Seiun Nerima (練馬 青雲, Nerima Seiun)
Shinagawa's childhood friend who attends the same school as Sagami. He finds ugly girls attractive and gets into trouble with the yakuza after unknowingly dating a gangster's wife online. He is secretly saved from this situation by Adachi. He is revealed to be the strongest of the Big Four.
Arisa Oomiya (大宮 有砂, Ōmiya Arisa)
A hotheaded but honest teenage girl whose attitude is reminiscent of Shinagawa. Adachi and Shinagawa meet her when her father asks them take money to her at the Shibuya District so that she can come home to celebrate New Year's with her family. She instead prefers to stay with her friend Misora who is only hanging with her for her money. Oomiya did not mind this since Misora made her "cool". When the money given by Oomiya's father is no longer enough for Misora, and Misora fails to use Adachi for more money, she has Oomiya kidnapped and sold into a prostitution ring at a Love hotel. Oomiya is saved by Adachi and agrees to go home to her father with Adachi and Shinagawa.
Kairi Shinagawa (品川 海里, Shinagawa Kairi)
Shinagawa's older sister. She and her brother share the same lazy, stubborn, and brutally honest attitude, but Kairi tends to be calmer and a bit quieter than her brother. Her boyfriend is Akita, the former student council president. After finding out about the university that Shinagawa plans to enter, Kairi decides to take the exam to transfer into the same university since she does not want to be the odd one out in the family as their parents are also graduates of said university.
You Adachi (足立 葉, Adachi You)
Adachi's delinquent younger brother and boss of the Big Four in Ageha Technical High School, and having only one eye to see for some reasons. Like Adachi, You has excellent fighting abilities and is capable of taking on the boys of Mon Shiro's Student Council on his own. However, unlike his sister, You is an all-around genius. He both fears and admires his sister, and his goal was to conquer the nation with her, but she had left the main house and put her delinquent days behind her. He too leaves home and attempts to live with Adachi, but after she refuses, he starts living with Shinagawa, whose family comes to accept him as their own. He still lives with them even after the four-year time skip.
Subaru Mito (水戸 すばる, Mito Subaru)
The Student Council Secretary at Aosuji Academy (水戸 すばる, Aosuji Gakuen) whose appearance and strength is strikingly similar to Adachi's. Shinigawa mistakes her for the girl that he met during his entrance exams at Mon Shiro. Subaru comes to like him and tells him that she knows the identity of that girl, eventually telling Miyagi Sakura that that girl has always been by his side. In order for her to not be mistaken as Adachi again, she cuts her hair short.

== Media ==
=== Manga ===
Written and illustrated by Miki Yoshikawa, Flunk Punk Rumble started as a three-part one-shot story published in Kodansha's shōnen manga magazine Weekly Shōnen Magazine from June 21 to July 5, 2006; it was later developed into a full series, published in the same magazine from October 18, 2006, to May 18, 2011. Kodansha collected its chapters in 23 tankōbon volumes, released from February 16, 2007, to June 17, 2011.

The manga was released in English by Chuang Yi in Singapore. Three volumes were published from March 4, 2008, to January 20, 2009.

=== Drama ===
A 10-episode television drama adaptation was broadcast on TBS from April 23 to June 25, 2010. The series' theme song is "Loose Leaf" (ルーズリーフ, Rūzu Rīfu) by Hilcrhyme.

=== Other media ===
A crossover one-shot chapter with Fairy Tail, titled Fairy Megane (FAIRY メガネ), was published in Weekly Shōnen Magazine on November 19, 2008, and released in the 11th volume of the manga.

An official guidebook was released by Kodansha on March 17, 2010. includes detailed information about the characters and production of the series, illustrations, and an interview between Yoshikawa and Hiro Mashima, for whom Yoshikawa previously worked as an assistant.

A crossover anime short with Yoshikawa's other series, Yamada-kun and the Seven Witches, titled Yamada-kun to 7-nin no Majo × Yankī-kun to Megane-chan (山田くんと7人の魔女×ヤンキー君とメガネちゃん 夢の共演コラボアニメーション), was included on the first DVD and Blu-ray Disc box sets of the Yamada-kun and the Seven Witches anime television series, released on August 26, 2015.
